This is a list of foreign players in Liga MX during the professional era which began in 1943. The following players:
have played at least one Primera División game for the respective club;
have not been capped for the Mexico national team at any level; or
have been born in Mexico and were capped by a foreign national team. This includes players who have dual citizenship with Mexico.

Players are sorted by the State:
they played for in a national team at any level. For footballers that played for two or more national teams, they are listed with:
the one he played for at A level;
the national team representing his state of birth; or
If they never played for any national team at any level, the state of birth. For footballers born in dissolved states, they are listed in the state which now represents their place of birth (e.g.,: Yugoslavia -> Serbia, Montenegro, Croatia, etc...).

Stateless people are marked with an asterisk.

In bold: players that played at least one Primera División game in the current season.

Clubs are not allowed to play more than five foreign players in a Liga MX match. In March 2011, PRI lawmakers introduced a proposal to reduce the limit to three foreign players. FMF President Justino Compeán did not support the failed proposal because he believed it would not improve the quality of Mexican football players.

As of 1 January 2009, Club América had employed the most foreign players of any club in the history of the Primera División, with more than 150 in the professional era. A total of 88 foreign players participated in the 2012 Apertura tournament, 29 originating from Argentina and 14 from Colombia.

Africa (CAF)

Algeria 
Andy Delort – Tigres – 2016–17

Cameroon 
Achille Emaná – Cruz Azul – 2013–14
David Embé – Tecos – 1996–98
Simon Moukoko – Tecos – 1997
Alain Nkong – Atlante, Indios – 2007, 2009–10
François Omam-Biyik – América, Yucatán FC, Puebla – 1994–96, 1997, 1999
Jean Claude Pagal – América – 1995
Patrick Soko – Atlas – 2017–18 
Joseph Tchango – Tecos – 1997/2001

Cape Verde 
Valdo – Atlante – 2012–13
Djaniny – Santos Laguna – 2014–18

Gambia 
Kekuta Manneh – Pachuca – 2018

Ghana 
Clifford Aboagye – Atlas, Querétaro, Tijuana, Puebla – 2017–19, 2019–20/2022–, 2020, 2021
Isaac Ayipei – Leones Negros, León, Veracruz – 1991–92, 1992–95, 1995–96

Ivory Coast 
Aké Arnaud Loba – Querétaro, Monterrey, Mazatlán – 2019, 2020–21, 2023–

Nigeria 
Alex Owhofasa – Atlante – 1995–96

São Tomé and Príncipe 
Luís Leal – Jaguares, Tijuana – 2017, 2020

Sierra Leone 
Abdul Thompson Conteh – Monterrey – 1999

Zambia 
Kalusha Bwalya – América, Necaxa, León – 1994–97, 1997, 1998

Asia (AFC)

Japan 
Keisuke Honda – Pachuca – 2017–18

Palestine 
Carlos Salom – Puebla – 2017

Europe (UEFA)

Armenia 
Lucas Zelarayán – Tigres – 2016–20

Bosnia-Herzegovina 
Davor Jozić – América – 1994
Sead Seferović – Tigres – 1995–96
Alen Škoro – Gallos Blancos – 2010

Bulgaria 
Emil Kostadinov – Tigres – 1997

Croatia 
Elvis Brajković – Santos Laguna, Atlante – 1999, 2000
Darko Vukic – Toluca, Celaya – 1998–99, 2000
Dario Brezak – Atlante, FC Inter Playa Del Carmen – 2012–2013, 2014

Czech Republic 
Josef Jelínek – Torreón – 1973–74

England 
Antonio Pedroza – Jaguares, Morelia, Cruz Azul, Toluca – 2010–11, 2012–13, 2015, 2016–17

France 
Julien Célestine – León – 2022–
André-Pierre Gignac – Tigres – 2015–
Timothée Kolodziejczak – Tigres – 2017–18
Jérémy Ménez – América – 2018–19
Amara Simba – León – 1997
Florian Thauvin – Tigres – 2021–22

Germany 
Maurizio Gaudino – América – 1995–96
Mateo Klimowicz – San Luis – 2023–
Peter Nover – Atlas – 1980–81
Bernd Schuster – Pumas – 1997
Uwe Wolf – Necaxa, Puebla – 1995–96, 1996–97

Hungary 
István Kádas – América – 1948–49
Iván Czintalán – América – 1948–49
György Marik – León – 1956–57

Italy 
Cristian Battocchio – Pumas – 2021–22
Mauro Camoranesi – Santos Laguna, Cruz Azul – 1995–96, 1998–00
Carmelo D'Anzi – Cruz Azul – 1980–81
Francesco Gallina – Atlante – 1971–74
Marco Rossi – América – 1995–96
Pietro Maiellaro – Tigres – 1995–96

Macedonia 
Sašo Miloševski – Veracruz – 1998
Viktor Trenevski – Puebla – 1998

Montenegro 
Dejan Batrović – León – 1997
Dejan Peković – Puebla – 1998

Netherlands 
Alessio da Cruz – Santos Laguna – 2021
Gerard Hylkema – Atlante – 1973–74
Vincent Janssen – Monterrey – 2019–22
Theo van der Heyden – Atlas – 1974–75
Romeo Wouden – Veracruz – 1998

Poland 
Jan Banaś – Atlético Español – 1975–76
Jan Gomola – Atlético Español, Zacatepec – 1974/1976–77, 1974–76
Grzegorz Lato – Atlante – 1982–84

Portugal 
Eusébio – Monterrey – 1975–76

Romania 
Miodrag Belodedici – Atlante – 1996–98
Ilie Dumitrescu – América, Atlante – 1997, 1997–98

Russia 
Viktor Derbunov – Atlas – 1992–93

Scotland 
Ronnie Sharp – San Luis – 1973–74

Serbia 
Miroslav Čermelj – Pumas – 1997–98
Branko Davidović – Tiburones Rojos de Veracruz – 1989–90
Zoran Djurić – Monterrey – 1997–98
Miroslav Draganić – Tampico – 1980–82
Aleksandar Janjić – Puebla – 1998
Mile Knežević – Puebla – 1998
Goran Milojević – América – 1997
Bora Milutinović – Pumas – 1972–77
Zdenko Muf – Tecos, León – 1997-01/2002, 2001
Vlada Stošić – Atlante – 1997
Vojimir Sinđic – Puebla – 1998–99

Slovakia 
David Depetris – Morelia – 2014–15

Slovenia 
Andrés Vombergar – San Luis – 2021–22

Spain 
Abraham – Pumas, Lobos BUAP, Veracruz – 2016–18, 2018–19, 2019
Mario Abrante – San Luis – 2019–20
Serafín Aedo – España – 1943–49
Raúl Amarilla – América – 1989–90
Alejandro Arribas – Pumas, Juárez – 2018–19, 2022–
Juan Manuel Asensi – Puebla, Oaxtepec – 1980–82, 1982–83
Manuel Alonso – América 1945–1946
José Mari Bakero – Veracruz – 1997
Saúl Berjón – Pumas – 2016
Unai Bilbao – San Luis, Necaxa – 2019–20/2021–, 2020–21
Gregorio Blasco – España, Atlante – 1943–46, 1946–47
Emilio Butragueño – Celaya – 1995–98
Cadete – Querétaro, San Luis – 2019–20, 2020
Leonardo Cilaurren – España – 1943–45
Marc Crosas – Santos Laguna, Leones Negros, Cruz Azul – 2012–14, 2014–15, 2015
Paulino de la Fuente – Pachuca – 2022–
José Miguel Díez Balerdi – Veracruz – 1943–44
Álvaro Fidalgo – América – 2021–
Fernando García – España, Marte – 1948–49, 1950–51
Pol García – Juárez – 2021
Luis García Fernández – Tigres – 2012–13
Luis García Sanz – Puebla, Pumas – 2011–12, 2012–2013
Ian González – San Luis, Necaxa, Toluca – 2019–20, 2020–21, 2021–22
Ricardo González Bango – Celaya – 2001–02
Pep Guardiola – Dorados – 2006
Francisco Higuera – Puebla – 1997
Santiago Idígoras – Puebla – 1981–82
José Iraragorri – España – 1943–46
Isidro Lángara – España – 1943–46
Carlos Leblanc Pallas – Veracruz – 1943–44
Luna – Monterrey – 2000–01
Javier Manjarín – Celaya, Santos Laguna – 2001–02, 2002–03
Édgar Méndez – Cruz Azul, Necaxa – 2017–20, 2022–
Jorge Meré – América, Mazatlán – 2022, 2022
Sabin Merino – San Luis – 2022–
Míchel – Celaya – 1996–97
Iván Moreno y Fabianesi – Morelia – 2006
Carlos Muñoz – Puebla – 1996–98
Josu Ortuondo – Atlético Español – 1980–82
Miguel Pardeza – Puebla – 1998–99
Rafael Paz – Celaya – 1997
Pirri – Puebla – 1980–82
Luis Regueiro – América – 1943–44
Raúl Tamudo – Pachuca – 2012
Mariano Uceda – América – 1946–47
Joaquín Urquiaga – Asturias, Veracruz – 1943–44, 1944–46
Rafael Martín Vázquez – Celaya – 1998
Víctor Vázquez – Cruz Azul – 2016
Martí Ventolrà – Atlante – 1943–49

Switzerland 
Alessandro Mangiarratti – Atlas – 2005
Jörg Stiel – Toros Neza – 1993–94

Turkey 
Colin Kazim-Richards – Lobos BUAP, Veracruz, Pachuca – 2018, 2019, 2020

North and Central America, Caribbean (CONCACAF)

Canada 
Lucas Cavallini – Puebla, Tijuana – 2017–19, 2023–
Stephen Eustáquio – Cruz Azul – 2019
Paul James – Monterrey – 1985–87
John Kerr, Sr. – América – 1972–73
Tibor Vigh – Laguna, Torreón – 1969–70, 1970–71

Costa Rica 
Ever Alfaro – Atlante – 2011
Evelio Alpízar – Atlas, Nacional – 1956–57, 1961–62
Carlos Alvarado Villalobos – América – 1947–48
Alfonso Arnáez – Moctezuma – 1943–49
Javier Astua – Morelia – 1992–93
Leonel Boza – León – 1953–57
Hernán Cabalceta – América – 1943–46
Joel Campbell – León, Monterrey – 2019–21/2022–, 2021–22
Quico Chacón – Atlas – 1956–57
Edwin Cubero – Atlas, Puebla – 1945–54, 1954–55
Eduardo Echeverría – Torreón – 1970–71
Quino Fernández – América – 1950–51
Guido Matamoros – América – 1943–46
Rónald Gómez – Irapuato –2004
Mauricio Solís – Irapuato –2004
Alonso Solís – Necaxa – 2008
Pablo Gabas – Necaxa, Querétaro, Chiapas – 2008–09, 2013–14
Alex Madrigal – Veracruz – 2003
Hernán Medford – Pachuca, León, Necaxa – 1996–97, 1997–00, 2000–01
Wálter Meneses – Puebla, Moctezuma, ADO – 1944–45, 1945–47, 1947–49
José Rafael Meza – Moctezuma, Atlante – 1944–45/1948–49, 1945–48
Édgar Murillo – San Sebastián – 1947–49
Evaristo Murillo – Moctezuma, Veracruz, Zacatepec – 1943–48, 1948–50, 1951–55
Mario Murillo – Moctezuma, Veracruz – 1945–48, 1948–49
Roy Myers – Pachuca – 1996–97
Reynaldo Parks – Tecos – 1998–01
Jorge Quezada – América – 1948–50
Ramón Rodríguez Soto – Irapuato – 1954–58
Oscar Emilio Rojas – La Piedad, Dorados, Veracruz, Jaguares, Morelia – 2001–02, 2004–05, 2005–06, 2006–08, 2009
Carlos Silva Loaiza – Moctezuma – 1944–47
Rodrigo Solano – Atlas – 1943–49
Jorge Solís – Atlas, Nacional – 1956–57, 1961–62
Jafet Soto – Morelia, Atlas, Pachuca, Puebla, Tecos – 1995–97/2001, 1998, 1998–99, 1999–00/2002–04, 2000–01
José Luis Soto – Irapuato – 1954–56
Juan Iván Soto – América – 1957–58
Gerson Torres – América, Necaxa – 2017, 2018
Max Villalobos – Irapuato – 1955–68
Harold Wallace – San Luis – 2002–03

Cuba 
Juan Ayra – España – 1944–45
Juan Tuñas – España – 1943–45

Curaçao 
Ronald Martell – América – 1961–62

El Salvador 
Mauricio Cienfuegos – Morelia, Santos Laguna, Tampico Madero – 1991–92, 1992–93, 1994–95
Gualberto Fernández – Atlante – 1970
Norberto Huezo – Monterrey – 1977
Amando Moreno – Tijuana – 2016
Nildeson – Toluca, Correcaminos, Toros Neza – 1993–94, 1994–95, 1996–97
Luis Ramírez Zapata – Puebla – 1978
Jaime Rodríguez – León, Atlas – 1982–84, 1986–90

Guatemala 
Alan Casasola – Atlas – 1998
Antonio López – América, Necaxa – 2018–22, 2022
Martín Machón – Santos Laguna, Atlas – 1999, 2002
Guillermo Ramírez – Jaguares – 2003
Rubio Rubin – Tijuana – 2018
Carlos Ruíz – Puebla – 2009–10

Honduras 
Geovany Ávila – Pachuca – 1992–93
Brayan Beckeles Necaxa – 2016–19
Eduardo Bennett – Cobras – 1991–92
Luis Enrique Cálix – Santos Laguna – 1990–91
Joshua Canales – Querétaro – 2021
Michaell Chirinos – Lobos BUAP – 2018–19
Carlo Costly – Atlas – 2011
Félix Crisanto – Lobos BUAP – 2018–19
Arnold Cruz – Correcaminos, Toluca, Morelia – 1994–95, 1995–96, 1996
Eugenio Dolmo Flores – Santos Laguna – 1990–92
Juan Alberto Flores Madariaga – Santos Laguna – 1990–94
Julio César de León – Celaya – 2000
Alberth Elis – Monterrey – 2016
Amado Guevara – Toros Neza – 2001
Walter Hernández – Puebla – 2002
Emil Martínez – Indios – 2010
Raúl Martínez Sambulá – Correcaminos – 1988–94
Ninrrol Medina – Atlante – 2005
Milton Núñez – Pachuca, Necaxa – 2002, 2003–04
Ramón Núñez – Puebla, Cruz Azul – 2009, 2009
César Obando – Correcaminos – 1994–95
Carlos Padilla – Correcaminos – 1999
Carlos Pavón – Toluca, Necaxa, Celaya, Morelia, Cruz Azul – 1994–95, 1997–98, 1998–00, 2000–01/2004, 2005
Alejandro Pineda Chacón – Correcaminos – 1994–95
Tomás Róchez – Santos Laguna – 1990–91
Christian Santamaría – Celaya – 1999
Richardson Smith – Correcaminos, Leones Negros – 1991–92, 1992–93
Danilo Turcios – Tecos – 2003–04
Wilmer Velasquez – Atlas – 2001–06
Georgie Welcome – Atlas – 2011

Jamaica 
Ravel Morrison – Atlas – 2017–18

Panama 
Felipe Baloy – Monterrey, Santos Laguna, Morelia, Atlas – 2005–09, 2010–2013, 2014–15, 2015–16
Yoel Bárcenas – Mazatlán – 2022–
Víctor René Mendieta – Correcaminos, Leones Negros, Tampico Madero – 1990–92, 1992–93, 1994–95
Roberto Nurse – Sinaloa, Pachuca – 2015, 2020–21
Blas Pérez – Tigres, Pachuca, San Luis – 2008, 2009, 2010
Luis Tejada – Toluca, Veracruz – 2012–13, 2013
Gabriel Torres – Pumas – 2021

Trinidad and Tobago 
Warren Archibald – San Luis – 1973–74
Everald Cummings – Veracruz – 1974–75
Steve David – San Luis – 1973–74

United States
Richard Allan Adams – Santos Laguna – 1991–92
Jozy Altidore – Puebla – 2022
Ventura Alvarado – América, Necaxa, Santos Laguna, San Luis,Juárez – 2012–16, 2013–14/2018–20, 2017, 2020–21, 2022–
Daniel Antúnez – Estudiantes – 2011
Fernando Arce – Tijuana, Necaxa, Juárez, Puebla – 2014/2019, 2020–21, 2022, 2023–
Paul Arriola – Tijuana – 2013–17
Marcelo Balboa – León – 1995–96
DaMarcus Beasley – Puebla – 2011–14
Scott Benedetti – Pumas – 1991–92
Jonathan Bornstein – Tigres, Atlante, Querétaro – 2011–13, 2014, 2015–18
Edgar Castillo – Santos Laguna, América, Tigres, San Luis, Puebla, Tijuana, Atlas, Monterrey – 2005–08, 2009/2011, 2009–10, 2010, 2011, 2012–14, 2014–15, 2015–18
Joe Corona – Tijuana, Veracruz, Sinaloa, América – 2011–15/2017/2019, 2015, 2016, 2018
Landon Donovan – León – 2018
Chris Edwinson – Atlas – 1988–89
Gabriel Farfan – Chiapas – 2013–16
Joe Gallardo – Querétaro – 2021
Greg Garza – Tijuana, Atlas – 2012–15/2016, 2015
Mike Getchell – Monterrey – 1988–89
Luis Gil – Querétaro – 2016–17
Hérculez Gómez – Puebla, Pachuca, Estudiantes, Santos Laguna, Tijuana, Tigres – 2010/2015, 2010–11, 2011, 2012–13, 2013–14, 2014
Omar Gonzalez – Pachuca, Atlas – 2016–18, 2018–19
Sonny Guadarrama – Santos Laguna, Morelia, Atlante – 2006–07, 2008, 2010–12
Alonso Hernández – Monterrey – 2012–15
Daniel Hernández – Necaxa, Puebla, Jaguares – 2003–05/2009, 2007, 2008
Miguel Ibarra – León – 2015
Mauricio Isais – León, Pachuca – 2020, 2022–
Dominic Kinnear – Necaxa – 1994–95
Cle Kooiman – Cobras, Cruz Azul – 1990–91, 1992–94
Rodrigo López – Toluca, Veracruz – 2017, 2019
Lawrence Lozzano – Tampico – 1995-95
Sammy Ochoa – Estudiantes – 2006–10
Michael Orozco – San Luis, Puebla, Tijuana, Lobos BUAP – 2006–09/2011–12, 2013–15, 2015–18, 2018–19
Tab Ramos – Tigres – 1995–96
John Requejo – Tijuana – 2016
Jacobo Reyes – Monterrey – 2021–
David Rodríguez – San Luis – 2021–
Adrián Ruelas – Santos Laguna, Jaguares – 2011, 2011–12
Jorge Salcedo – Morelia – 1995
Sebastián Saucedo – Veracruz, Pumas, Toluca – 2016, 2020–22, 2022–
Alan Soñora – Juárez – 2023–
Joel Soñora – Juárez – 2023–
Mike Sorber – Pumas – 1994–96
Jonathan Suárez – Querétaro, Tijuana – 2018–20, 2022
José Francisco Torres – Pachuca, Tigres, Puebla – 2006–2012, 2013–17, 2018
Marco Vidal – Pachuca, León, Veracruz – 2010, 2011–12, 2016
Jorge Villafaña – Santos Laguna – 2016–18
Jean Willrich Pumas – 1979–80
Eric Wynalda – León – 1999
William Yarbrough – León – 2012–19
Alejandro Zendejas – Guadalajara, Necaxa, América – 2016–17/2018–20, 2020–21, 2022–

South America (CONMEBOL)

Argentina 
Roberto Aballay – Asturias – 1944–45
Matías Abelairas – Puebla – 2012
Luciano Acosta – Atlas – 2020–21
Héctor Adomaitis – Santos Laguna, Cruz Azul, Puebla – 1993–97, 1997–01, 2001–02
Emanuel Aguilera – Tijuana, América, Atlas – 2016–17, 2018–21, 2022
Jonás Aguirre – Necaxa, Puebla – 2017, 2017
Lucas Albertengo – Monterrey – 2018
Rafael Albrecht – León, Atlas – 1970–74, 1974–75
Fabián Alegre – Atlas – 1992–93
Germán Alemanno – Gallos Blancos – 2012
Facundo Almada – Mazatlán – 2023–
Jorge Almirón – Atlas, Morelia, Gallos Blancos, Atlante – 1997–99, 2000–04, 2006–07, 2007–08
Rafael Altube – Tampico – 1945–50
Matías Alustiza – Puebla, Pachuca, Atlas, Pumas – 2012–14/2015–16/2019, 2014, 2017, 2018
Favio Álvarez – Pumas – 2020–22
Ricky Álvarez – Atlas – 2018–19
Horacio Ameli – América – 2004
Luis Antonio Amuchástegui – América – 1986–87
Esteban Andrada – Monterrey – 2021–
Martín Andrizzi – Dorados – 2004
Alfredo Anhielo – Tampico, Potosino – 1978–79, 1979–80
Antonio Apud – Santos Laguna, Veracruz, León – 1992–95, 1995–96, 1996
Germán Arangio – Toros Neza, Atlante – 1996–00, 2000–01
Raúl Aredes – Monterrey – 1994–96
Emiliano Armenteros – Jaguares, Santos Laguna – 2014–16, 2016–17
Marcelo Asteggiano – Cruz Azul – 1989–90
Daniel Asteguiano – Cruz Azul – 1979–80, Atlético Español 1981–82, Atlas – 1982–83
Rubén Astigarraga – Zacatepec – 1975–77
Rodrigo Astudillo – Cruz Azul – 2001
Juan Pablo Avendaño – San Luis – 2005
Rubén Ayala – Jalisco, Atlante – 1979–80, 1980–84
Juan Manuel Azconzábal – Tecos – 2002–03
Eduardo Bacas – Tigres – 1990–91
Emilio Baldonedo – Monterrey, Puebla – 1945–46, 1946–47
Claudio Baravane – Tampico Madero – 1989–90
Miguel Barbieri – Tijuana, Toluca, Querétaro – 2020, 2021, 2023–
David Barbona – Tijuana, Querétaro – 2020–22, 2022
Ciro Barbosa – San Luis – 1971–72
Mariano Barbosa – Atlas – 2009–10
Marcelo Barovero – Necaxa, Monterrey, San Luis – 2016–18, 2018–20, 2021–
Maximiliano Barreiro – Necaxa – 2017
Pablo Barrientos – Toluca – 2016–19
Marcelo Barticciotto – América – 1993–94
José María Basanta – Monterrey – 2008–14/2015–20
Damián Batallini – San Luis, Necaxa – 2021, 2023–
Osvaldo Batocletti – León, Tigres – 1975–77, 1977–84
Antonio Battaglia – León – 1944–52
Edgardo Bauza – Veracruz – 1990–91
Fernando Belluschi – Cruz Azul – 2015
Néstor Benedetich – León – 2000
Darío Benedetto – Tijuana, América – 2013–14, 2015–16
Óscar Benítez – San Luis – 2019
Gonzalo Bergessio – Atlas – 2015–16
Eduardo Berizzo – Atlas – 1993–96
Hernán Bernardello – Cruz Azul – 2014
Ángel Bernuncio – Necaxa, Toros Neza – 1992–93, 1993–94
Germán Berterame – San Luis, Monterrey – 2019–22, 2022–
Alfredo Jesús Berti – Atlas – 1995
Sergio Berti – América – 1999–00
Pablo Bezombe – Morelia – 1999
Maxi Biancucchi – Cruz Azul – 2010
Daniel Bilos – América – 2007
Víctor Binello – Morelia – 1981–84
Ismael Blanco – San Luis – 2011–12
Ángel Bocanelli – León – 1981–82
Norberto Boggio – Atlante – 1963–71
Pablo Facundo Bonvín – Dorados – 2005
Miguel Ángel Bordón – Atlas – 1981–82/1983–84
Mauro Boselli – León – 2013–18
Carlos Bossio – Gallos Blancos – 2009–10
Rubén Botta – Pachuca – 2015–17
Darío Bottinelli – Atlas, Toluca – 2008–10, 2015–16
Jonathan Bottinelli – León – 2014–15
Gustavo Bou – Tijuana – 2017–19
Lucas Bovaglio – Estudiantes – 2011–12
Diego Braghieri – Tijuana – 2019
Sergio Bratti – Monterrey – 1977–78
Martín Bravo – Pumas, León, Sinaloa, Santos Laguna, Veracruz – 2008–14, 2014–15, 2015, 2016, 2017–18
Juan Brunetta – Santos Laguna – 2022–
Sebastián Brusco – Toros Neza – 1999
Hernán Buján – Morelia – 2002
José María Buljubasich – Morelia – 2001–02
Diego Buonanotte – Pachuca – 2014–15
Guillermo Burdisso – León – 2015–18
Carlos Bustos – Morelia – 1997, 1999
Diego Daniel Bustos – Veracruz – 1995
Eduardo Ariel Bustos – Atlas – 1999/2001
Nahuel Bustos – Pachuca – 2019
Roberto Cabral – Atlas – 1981–82
Gustavo Cabral – Estudiantes, Pachuca – 2010–11, 2019–
Florencio Caffaratti – América – 1943–52
Matías Cahais – Veracruz – 2016
José Luis Calderón – América, Atlas – 2000–01, 2001–03
Francisco Campana – América – 1958–59
Cristian Campestrini – Puebla – 2015–17
Javier Cámpora – Cruz Azul, Jaguares, Puebla – 2006, 2007, 2008
Patricio Camps – Tecos – 2003–04
Alexis Canelo – Jaguares, Puebla, Toluca, Tijuana – 2016, 2016–17, 2017–22, 2022–
Germán Cano – Pachuca, León – 2015/2017, 2016–17
Gustavo Canto – Tijuana – 2018
Ignacio Canuto – León – 2015
Marcelo Capirossi – Pachuca, Santos Laguna – 1992–93, 1998
Milton Caraglio – Sinaloa, Tijuana, Atlas, Cruz Azul – 2016, 2016–17, 2017–18/2021, 2018–20
Mauricio Caranta – Santos Laguna – 2005–06
Juan Carlos Cárdenas – Puebla, Veracruz – 1972–74/1975–76, 1974–75
Martín Cardetti – Pumas – 2005
Neri Cardozo – Jaguares, Monterrey, Querétaro – 2009, 2010–16/2017, 2016–17
Andrés Carevic – Atlante – 2003/2007–11
Mario Enrique Cariaga – Atlas – 1981–83
Luis Carniglia – Atlas – 1945–46
Marcelo Carracedo – Santos Laguna, Morelia – 1994–96, 1996
Ramiro Carrera – Cruz Azul – 2023–
Roberto Hugo Carril – Laguna, Santos Laguna, Atlético Español – 1975–76, 1976–77, 1977–78
Federico Carrizo – Cruz Azul – 2015
Juan Pablo Carrizo – Monterrey – 2017–18
Marcelo Carrusca – Cruz Azul – 2008–09
Carlos Casartelli – Atlante, Veracruz, Gallos Blancos, Monterrey, Tecos – 2000–01, 2002–03, 2004, 2005, 2006
Santiago Cáseres – América – 2020
Hugo Norberto Castillo – Monterrey, Atlas, América, Santos Laguna – 1996–97, 1998–01, 2002–04, 2004–06
Alexis Castro – Tijuana – 2020
Matías Catalán – San Luis, Pachuca – 2019–20, 2021
Martín Cauteruccio – Cruz Azul – 2017–19
Juan Manuel Cavallo – San Luis – 2011
Emanuel Cecchini – León – 2018
Mauro Cejas – Tecos, Monterrey, Pachuca, Santos Laguna, Morelia, Puebla – 2007–08/2009–11, 2008, 2011–12, 2013–14, 2015, 2016
Emanuel Centurión – Atlas – 2008–11
Iván Centurión – Puebla – 2017
Ricardo Centurión – San Luis – 2019
Maximiliano Cerato – León – 2017–18
Diego Cocca – Atlas, Veracruz – 1999–01, 2003–04
Jorge Coch – Toluca, Puebla, Veracruz, Zacatepec – 1971–72, ?, 1975–76, 1976–77
Raúl Héctor Cocherari – Curtidores – 1977–78
Hugo Colace – Estudiantes – 2011–12
Santiago Colombatto – León – 2021–22
Diego Colotto – Tecos, Atlas – 2005–07, 2007–08
Cristian Colusso – León – 1997
Jorge Comas – Veracruz – 1989–94
Ángel David Comizzo – Tigres, León, Morelia – 1990–91, 1996–98, 1999–01
Germán Conti – Atlas – 2020
Rodrigo Contreras – Necaxa – 2019
Miguel Ángel Converti – León – 1979
Marcos Conigliaro – Jalisco – 1971–72
Matías Córdoba – Atlante – 2011
Facundo Coria – Pachuca – 2011
Oscar Roberto Cornejo – Dorados – 2004–05
Miguel Ángel Cornero – América, Cruz Azul, Toluca – 1974–77, 1977–81, 1983–84
Javier Correa – Santos Laguna, Atlas – 2019/2022–, 2019–21
Hugo Coscia – Potosino – 1975–77
Eduardo Coudet – San Luis, Necaxa – 2007–08/2009, 2009
Walter Coyette – Atlas – 2001–02
Ariel Cozzoni – Toluca – 1992
Hernán Cristante – Toluca – 1993–94/1995–96/1998–09
Oscar Craiyacich – León – 1981–82
Jonatan Cristaldo – Cruz Azul, Monterrey – 2016, 2017
Federico Crivelli – Jaguares – 2016
Maximiliano Cuberas – Toluca – 2001–04
Bernardo Cuesta – Puebla – 2020
Juan Cuevas – Toluca, San Luis, Atlante, León – 2010–11, 2011/2013, 2011–12, 2016
Leandro Cufré – Atlas, Leones Negros – 2012–14, 2014–15
Hugo Curioni – Toluca – 1980
Darío Cvitanich – Pachuca – 2010–11/2015
Juan Carlos Czentoriky – Jalisco, Curtidores, Puebla – 1971–72, 1975–1977, 1977–78
Ricardo Dabrowski – Toluca – 1984–85
Mariano Dalla Libera – Atlas – 1989–90
Israel Damonte – Veracruz – 2006
Luciano De Bruno – Jaguares – 2003
Vicente de la Mata – Necaxa, Veracruz – 1970–71, 1971–76
Gustavo Del Prete – Pumas – 2022–
César Delgado – Cruz Azul, Monterrey – 2003–07, 2011–15
Marcelo Delgado – Cruz Azul – 1994–95/2003–04
Pedro Dellacha – Necaxa – 1959–62
Roberto Andres Depietri – Toluca, Pumas – 1990–94, 1995–96
Gustavo Dezotti – León, Atlas – 1994–96, 1996–97
Daniel Díaz – Cruz Azul – 2003–04
Gonzalo Díaz – América, Tijuana – 2014, 2016
Jorge Manuel Díaz – Veracruz – 1993
Leandro Díaz – Veracruz – 2017
Roberto Osvaldo Díaz – Tampico, Tigres, América, León – 1977–78, 1978–79, 1980–81, 1981–82
Rodrigo Díaz – Toluca – 2005–06
Juan Dinenno – Pumas – 2020–
Jerónimo di Florio – León, Irapuato – 1954–66, 1966–67
Marcos Aurelio Di Paulo – León – 1947–48
Franco Di Santo – Tijuana – 2022
Lucas Di Yorio – León – 2022–
Federico Domínguez – Santos Laguna – 2004
Nery Domínguez – Querétaro – 2016
Sebastián Domínguez – América – 2008
Cristian Domizi – Atlas, Pumas, Monterrey – 1993–95, 1996–98, 1998
Alejandro Donatti – Tijuana – 2017
Manuel Duarte – Querétaro – 2023–
Francisco Dutari – Pumas – 2014
Gustavo Pedro Echaniz – América, Puebla, Cobras de Querétaro  – 1983–84, 1984–85, 1986–87
Javier Elizondo – Gallos Blancos – 2010
Hernán Encina – Tecos, Atlas – 2007, 2007
Gabriel Esparza – Puebla – 2017
Marcelo Espina – Irapuato, Atlante, Correcaminos – 1990–91, 1991–92, 1993–94
Fabián Espíndola – Necaxa – 2016–17
Javier Alejandro Espínola – Necaxa, América – 1999, 1999
Facundo Erpen – Atlas, Puebla, Morelia, Lobos BUAP – 2012–15/2017, 2015, 2015–17, 2018
Walter Erviti – Monterrey, Atlante – 2002–08, 2013–14
Damián Escudero – Puebla – 2016
Alberto Etcheverry – León, Irapuato, Pumas, Atlante, Jabatos – 1958–61, 1961–62, 1963–64, 1965–66, 1966–69
Jonathan Fabbro – Sinaloa – 2005
Juan Carlos Falcón – Atlante – 2005–06
Daniel Fasciolli – Veracruz – 1996–97
Alejandro Faurlín – Cruz Azul – 2017
Marcelo Favaretto – América, Toros Neza – 1981–82, 1982–85
Brian Fernández – Necaxa – 2018–19
Gastón Fernández – Monterrey, Tigres – 2006, 2008–09
Guillermo Fernández – Cruz Azul – 2019/2021
Mauro Fernández – Juárez – 2019–20
Héctor Ferrari – América – 1953–54
Facundo Ferreyra – Tijuana – 2022
Nelson Festa – América – 1958–59
Emilio Fizel – América – 1953–57
Juan Ramón Fleita – Toros Neza – 1997–99
Luciano Figueroa – Cruz Azul – 2004
Lucio Filomeno – Jaguares – 2002–04
Silvio Fogel – Torreón, Puebla, Cruz Azul – 1973–74, 1975–80/1982–83, 1980–81
Juan Forlín – Querétaro – 2015–17
Mauro Formica – Cruz Azul, Pumas – 2013–15, 2017–18
Mario Franceschini – Morelia- 1981–82
Ariel Franco – Toluca – 2002–03
Darío Franco – Atlas, Morelia – 1995–97, 1998–04
Nicolás Freire – Pumas – 2019–
Adonis Frías – León – 2023–
Fabricio Fuentes – Atlas – 2005–06/2010
Ramiro Funes Mori – Cruz Azul – 2022–
Julio Furch – Veracruz, Santos Laguna, Atlas – 2015–16, 2017–20, 2021–
Pablo Antonio Gabas – Necaxa, Querétaro, Jaguares – 2008–09, 2013, 2014
Jorge Luis Gabrich – Irapuato, Veracruz, Tecos – 1989–90, 1990–92, 1992–94
Alejandro Gagliardi – Morelia – 2016
Walter Gaitán – Tigres, Necaxa – 2002–07, 2008
Mario Raúl Galasso – América – 1946–47
José Gallego – Necaxa – 1993–94
Rubén Horacio Galletti – Tecos – 1975–78
Martín Galmarini – Atlante – 2013–14
Diego Galván – Morelia – 2002
Darío Gandín – Necaxa – 2010–11
Javier Gandolfi – Jaguares, Tijuana – 2009–10, 2011–16
Óscar Garanzini – América – 1958–59
Ariel Garcé – Morelia – 2003
Matías García – Juárez – 2021–22
Óscar García – Toros Neza – 1994–95
Rodolfo García – Atlas, Morelia, Monterrey, Pachuca – 1995–97, 1998, 1999, 2004
Santiago García – Toluca – 2017–19
Daniel Garnero – Toros Neza – 2000
Roberto Daniel Gasparini – Necaxa, Tigres, Monterrey – 1988–89, 1989–94, 1994–95
Enzo Gennoni – Laguna – 1971–73
Mauro Néstor Gerk – Gallos Blancos, Tijuana – 2006–07/2009, 2011–12
Jorge Luis Ghiso – Tecos – 1979–80
Emmanuel Gigliotti – Toluca, León – 2019–20, 2020–21
Christian Giménez – Veracruz, América, Pachuca, Cruz Azul – 2004–05, 2005–06, 2006–09/2018, 2010–18
Christian Eduardo Giménez – Toluca – 2007–08
Milton Giménez – Necaxa – 2022–23
Luis Giribet – San Luis – 1971–73
Blas Giunta – Toluca – 1993–95
Alejandro Glaría – Pachuca, Puebla, Pumas, Jaguares – 1998–00, 2000, 2001, 2002
Paolo Goltz – América – 2014–17
Alberto Gómez – Cruz Azul, Potosino, Deportivo Neza – 1971–76, 1976–77, 1979–80
Alberto Martín Gómez – Morelia – 2002–03
Pablo Hernán Gómez – Morelia, Pachuca – 1998, 1999–01
Pablo Leandro Gómez – Puebla, Querétaro – 2019, 2021
Rodrigo Gómez – Toluca – 2016–17
Ariel González – Irapuato, América, San Luis, Pumas, Veracruz – 2003, 2004, 2005–06/2007, 2006–07, 2008
Diego González – Santos Laguna, Tijuana – 2015–16, 2018–19
Esteban Alberto González – Gallos Blancos – 2009
Federico González – Puebla – 2017
Lucas González – Santos Laguna – 2023–
Pedro González – Morelia – 1992–94
Ramiro González – León, San Luis – 2019–20/2021, 2020–21
Sergio Nelson González – Santos Laguna, Morelia, Cobras, Atlante – 1988–89, 1990–91, 1991–92, 1992–93
Leandro González Pírez – Tijuana – 2020
Raúl Gordillo – América, Necaxa, Atlante – 1996, 1998, 1999
Hugo Gottfrit – Potosino, Atlante – 1976–78, 1978–80
César Gradito – Atlas, Estudiantes – 2004–07, 2010
Claudio Graf – Veracruz, Tecos – 2008, 2009
Mario Grana – Monterrey, Celaya, Colibríes – 2002, 2002, 2003
Fernando Ezequiel Gutiérrez – Estudiantes – 2012
Marcos Gutiérrez – Toros Neza – 1998
Nahuel Guzmán – Tigres – 2014–
Gabriel Hachen – Juárez – 2019
René Hanssen – América – 1944–45
Gabriel Hauche – Tijuana, Toluca – 2015–16, 2017–18
Patricio Hernández – Cruz Azul – 1989
Emanuel Herrera – Tigres, Lobos BUAP – 2014, 2017
Federico Higuaín – América – 2008
Rodrigo Holgado – Veracruz – 2017
Henry Homann – Puebla – 1995
Santiago Hoyos – Santos Laguna – 2011–12
Horacio Humoller – Toluca, Atlante – 1990–95, 1995–96
Juan Carlos Hurt – Veracruz – 1970–71
Humberto Iacono – América – 1953–54
Nicolás Ibáñez – San Luis, Pachuca, Tigres – 2019–21, 2021–23, 2023–
Federico Illanes – Veracruz – 2019
Gaspar Iñíguez – Veracruz – 2019
Cristian Insaurralde – América – 2018–19
Juan Manuel Insaurralde – Jaguares – 2015–16
Federico Insúa – América, Necaxa – 2007–08, 2009
Luis Islas – Toluca, León – 1996–97, 2001–02
Carlos Izquierdoz – Santos Laguna – 2014–18
Franco Jara – Pachuca – 2015–20
Jorge Jerez – Celaya, Colibríes – 1998–02, 2003
Walter Jiménez – Veracruz, Jaguares, Santos Laguna, Puebla – 2003–05, 2006, 2006–10, 2011
Alberto Jorge – León, Tampico, Oaxtepec – 1975–76, 1978–79, 1982–84
Enzo Kalinski – Tijuana – 2017
Walter Kannemann – Atlas – 2015–16
Matías Kranevitter – Monterrey – 2020–22
Pablo Kratina – Santos Laguna – 1992–93
Julio César Laffatigue – Gallos Blancos – 2010
Federico Lagorio – Atlas, Pumas – 1998–99, 1999–00
Diego Lagos – Pumas – 2014
Osvaldo Lamelza – Potosino, Zacatepec – 1975–76, 1976–77
Luis Alberto Landaburu – Tampico – 1981–82
Joaquín Larrivey – Atlante – 2012–13
Joaquín Laso – San Luis – 2019
Diego Latorre – Cruz Azul, Celaya – 1999, 2001–02
Javier Lavallén – Pumas – 1997
Pablo Lavallén – Atlas, Veracruz, San Luis – 1996–01, 2002, 2003–04
Ricardo Lavolpe – Atlante, Oaxtepec – 1979–82, 1982–84
José Antonio Lazcano – Veracruz – 1945–46
Raúl Leguizamón – América – 1954–55
Eduardo Lell – Cobras – 1991–92
Fabián Lenguita – Toros Neza – 1993–94
Federico Lértora – Tijuana – 2022–
Gastón Lezcano – Morelia – 2017–19
Carlos Linazza – León – 1962–63
Lucas Lobos – Tigres, Toluca – 2008–14, 2014–16
Emanuel Loeschbor – Cruz Azul, Morelia – 2014–15, 2016–19
Lisandro López – Tijuana – 2022–
Augusto Lotti – Cruz Azul – 2023–
Cristian Lucchetti – Santos Laguna – 2003–04
Juan Martín Lucero – Tijuana – 2017–19
Daniel Ludueña – Tecos, Santos Laguna, Pachuca, Pumas – 2005–06, 2007–2012, 2013, 2013–16
Ricardo Lunari – Atlas, Puebla – 1993–95, 1995–96
Leopoldo Luque – Tampico – 1981–82
Federico Lussenhoff – Toros Neza, Cruz Azul – 1995–97, 2004–05
Patricio Mac Allister – Correcaminos – 1993–94
Adrián Mahía – Toros Neza – 1994–95
Cristian Maidana – Atlante – 2012–13
Jonatan Maidana – Toluca – 2019–20
Javier Malagueño – Indios – 2008–10
Víctor Malcorra – Tijuana, Pumas, Atlas – 2016–18, 2018–20, 2020–21
Federico Mancuello – Toluca, Puebla – 2019–20, 2022–
Damián Manso – Pachuca, Jaguares, Morelia – 2009–10, 2011, 2011
Edmundo Manzotti – Tigres – 1975–77
Agustín Marchesín – Santos Laguna, América – 2015–16, 2017–19
Sergio Raúl Marchi – Irapuato, Gallos Blancos – 1990–91, 1991–93
Iván Marcone – Cruz Azul – 2018–19
Miguel Marín – Cruz Azul – 1971–80
Hector Marinaro – Tampico – 1962–63
Guillermo Marino – Tigres – 2007–09
Bruno Marioni – Atlas – Pumas, Toluca, Tecos – 2004/2005–06/2007–08/2009, 2006, 2006, 2009
Gonzalo Maroni – Atlas – 2021–22
Germán Martellotto – América, Monterrey – 1990–92, 1993–95
Alejandro Martínez – Tijuana – 2023–
Miguel Ángel Martínez – Atlante, Jaguares, Querétaro – 2009–10, 2010–13, 2014–18
Oswaldo Martinoli – León – 1955–56
Roberto Aníbal Masciarelli – Atlas, Toluca, Leones Negros, Puebla – 1986–88, 1988–90, 1990–91, 1991–92
Pedro Massacessi – Cobras, Atlante, Pumas – 1990–92, 1992–94/1995–96, 1994–95
René Masson – América – 1950–52
Aníbal Matellán – San Luis – 2010–12
Pedro Maupone – América – 1950–51
Marcos Mauro – Juárez – 2022
Juan Meglio – Tecos, León – 1979–80, 1980–81
Jesús Méndez – Toluca – 2016–17
Cristian Menéndez – Veracruz, Puebla – 2017–19, 2020
Mariano Messera – Cruz Azul – 2002
Sergio Metini – Santos Laguna – 1992–93
Fernando Meza – Necaxa – 2016–17/2019/2021–
Maximiliano Meza – Monterrey – 2019–
Miguel Ángel Micco – Laguna, Zacatepec – 1971–76, 1976–77
José Miguel – Santos Laguna – 1995–99
Guido Milán – Veracruz – 2017–18
Ezequiel Miralles – Atlante – 2013
Leonel Miranda – Tijuana – 2019
Antonio Mohamed – Toros Neza, Monterrey, Irapuato, Atlante, Celaya – 1993–98, 1998–00, 2001, 2001–02, 2002
Roberto Molina – América, Atlante, Toros Neza, Puebla – 1998, 1999, 2000, 2000
Tomás Molina – Juárez – 2023–
Daniel Montenegro – América – 2009–2012
Walter Montillo – Morelia – 2006–07
Walter Montoya – Cruz Azul – 2018/2021
Ángel Morales – Cruz Azul, Veracruz, Dorados – 1999–02, 2002–04, 2006
Cristián Morales – Irapuato, Veracruz – 2000–01, 2002
Maximiliano Moralez – León – 2016–17
Alfredo Moreno – Necaxa, San Luis, América, Necaxa, Atlas, Tijuana, Puebla, Veracruz – 2001/2003–07, 2007–08/2009–10/2011–12, 2008, 2009, 2010–11, 2012–13/2014–15, 2013, 2014
José Manuel Moreno – España – 1944–46
Claudio Morresi – Santos Laguna – 1990–91
Gustavo Adolfo Moriconi – Monterrey, Gallos Blancos – 1990–91, 1991–92/1993–94
Víctor Javier Müller – Monterrey, Pumas, Pachuca – 2000, 2002, 2003
Javier Muñoz – Santos Laguna, Atlante, Pachuca, León, San Luis, Jaguares – 2005, 2006–08, 2009–12, 2012, 2013, 2013–17
Damián Musto – Tijuana – 2017–18
Máximo Raúl Nardoni – Atlas – 1982–83
Ariel Nahuelpán – Pumas, Pachuca, Tijuana, Querétaro, Mazatlán – 2013, 2014–16, 2019–20, 2020/2022, 2023–
Roberto Nanni – Atlante – 2013
Cristian Nasuti – Morelia – 2005–06
Nicolás Navarro – Querétaro – 2019
América Nazzer – América – 1958–59
Hugo Nervo – Santos Laguna, Atlas – 2018–19, 2019–
Mateo Nicolau – América – 1943–45
Guillermo Nicosia – Morelia – 1993
Franco Niell – Gallos Blancos – 2011
Oscar Nova – León – 1955–56
Diego Novaretti – Toluca, León, Querétaro – 2009–13, 2015–17, 2018–19
Javier Novello – Atlas – 1949–51
Juan José Novo – Atlas, León – 1948–52, 1952–53
Rodrigo Noya – Veracruz, Necaxa, San Luis – 2015–17/2018, 2019–20, 2020–21
Juan Carlos Oleniak – Veracruz – 1971–72
Diego Olsina – Tijuana – 2012–13, 2014
Gustavo Onaindía – Necaxa – 1999–00
Christian Ortiz – Tijuana – 2021–22
Fernando Ortiz – Santos Laguna, América, Tigres – 2007–08, 2009, 2009–10
Jorge Ortiz – Tijuana – 2017
Norberto Outes – América, Necaxa – 1981–83, 1983–85
Norberto Pairoux – Atlas – 1945–48
Sebastián Palacios – Pachuca – 2018
Omar Palma – Veracruz – 1989–92
Carlos Pancirolli – Irapuato, Cobras – 1989–90, 1990–91
Nicolás Pareja – Atlas – 2019
Lucas Passerini – Cruz Azul, Necaxa, San Luis – 2019/2021, 2020, 2021
Mario Pavés – América – 1958–61
Jorge Enrico Pavesi – Veracruz – 1945–49
Nicolás Pavlovich – Morelia, Necaxa – 2007, 2010
Mariano Pavone – Cruz Azul – 2012–14
José Pedante – Leones Negros – 1993–94
Cristian Pellerano – Tijuana, América, Morelia, Veracruz – 2012–14, 2015, 2015–16, 2017
Hernán Pellerano – Tijuana – 2014
José Manuel Peluffo – Morelia – 1982–83
Gabriel Peñalba – Veracruz, Cruz Azul – 2015–16/2019, 2017
Franco Peppino – Veracruz – 2007–08
Sixto Peralta – Santos Laguna, Tigres – 2003–04, 2004–06
Facundo Pereyra – San Luis, Necaxa – 2012–14, 2017
Gabriel Pereyra – Cruz Azul, Atlante, Morelia, Puebla, Estudiantes – 2005–07, 2007–09, 2010, 2010–11, 2012
Jorge Pereyra Díaz – León – 2017
Claudio Pérez – Puebla – 2017
Damián Pérez – Tijuana – 2016–18
Omar Sebastián Pérez – Jaguares – 2005
Rolando Pierucci – Laguna, Santos Laguna, Puebla – 1975–76, 1976–77, 1977–78
Daniel Pighín – Atlas – 1990–91
Matías Pisano – Tijuana – 2017
Héctor Pitarch – Atlas – 1980–82
Guido Pizarro – Tigres – 2013–17/2018–
Juan Antonio Pizzi – Toluca – 1990–91
Jose Luis Pochettino – Cobras – 1990–91
Edgardo Prátola – León – 1996–99
Claudio Puechagut – Colibríes – 2003
Pablo Quatrocchi – Veracruz, Necaxa – 2004–06, 2007–11
Mauro Quiroga – Necaxa, San Luis, Pachuca – 2019–20/2021, 2020, 2021
Leonardo Ramos – Lobos BUAP, León, Pachuca – 2018–19, 2019–20, 2020
Santiago Raymonda – Veracruz – 2008
Gerardo Reinoso – Correcaminos, León – 1993–94, 1994–95
Alberto Rendo – Laguna – 1971–72
Ezequiel Rescaldani – Puebla – 2015
Rodrigo Rey – Pachuca – 2019
Claudio Riaño – Necaxa – 2016–17/2018
Arsenio Ribeca – Monterrey – 1980–83
Walter Ribonetto – Gallos Blancos – 2004
Daniel Andrés Ríos – Veracruz, Toluca, Atlas – 2007, 2008–09, 2009
Andrés Ríos – América, Leones Negros – 2014, 2014–15
Gonzalo Ríos – León – 2015
Marcelo Rúben Ríos – Santos Laguna, Cruz Azul – 1998, 1999
Guillermo Rivarola – Pachuca, Santos Laguna, Monterrey – 1997/1999, 1998, 1999–01
Guido Rodríguez – Tijuana, América – 2016–17, 2017–19
Horacio Rodríguez – Tampico – 1981–82
Lucas Rodríguez – Veracruz – 2016–17
Lucas Rodríguez – Tijuana – 2021–
Ariel Rojas – Cruz Azul – 2015–17
Gabriel Rojas – Querétaro – 2022–23
Roberto Rolando – Tampico – 1959–62
Juan Romagnoli – Querétaro – 2022
Leandro Romagnoli – Veracruz – 2005
Martín Romagnoli – Toluca, Pumas – 2008–12, 2012–15
Braian Romero – Tijuana – 2023–
Lucas Romero – León – 2023–
Rubén Omar Romano – Gallos Blancos, Atlante, Cruz Azul, Veracruz – 1990–91, 1991–92/1994–95, 1992–93, 1993–94
Mauricio Romero – Morelia, Atlante, Puebla, Sinaloa – 2007–2012, 2013–14, 2014–15, 2015
Silvio Romero – Jaguares, América – 2015–16, 2016–17
Ariel Rosada – Toluca – 2005–07
Nicolás Roselli – Potosino – 1977–80
Pablo Rotchen – Monterrey – 2002–05
Carlos Rotondi – Cruz Azul – 2022–
Marco Ruben – Tigres – 2014
Silvio Rudman – Veracruz, Atlas, Toros Neza – 1992–93/1997, 1993–94, 1995–96
Oscar Ruggeri – América – 1992–94
Miguel Ángel Rugilo – León – 1945
Alejandro Sabella – Irapuato – 1988–89
Lorenzo Sáez – Toluca, Pachuca, Monterrey, León – 1993–94, 1996–97, 1997, 1998–99
Maximiliano Salas – Necaxa – 2019–22
Roberto Salomone – León – 1971–77
Eduardo Salvio – Pumas – 2022–
Rubens Sambueza – Pumas, Tecos, América, Toluca, León, Pachuca, San Luis – 2007–08, 2009–12, 2012–16, 2017–18/2020–21, 2019, 2019–20, 2022
Nicolás Sánchez – Monterrey – 2017–21
José Sand – Tijuana – 2011–12
Jorge Santecchia – León – 1980–82
José Santiago – América – 1953–54
Nicolás Saucedo – Toluca – 2015–16
Gastón Sauro – Toluca – 2019–21
Luis Scatolaro – Irapuato, Necaxa – 1990–91, 1991–94
Ángel Schandlein – América – 1959–60
Damián Schmidt – Puebla – 2016–17
Juan Carlos Sconfianza – Toluca, Puebla – 1971–72, 1972–76
Norberto Scoponi – Cruz Azul – 1994–97
Dario Scotto – Necaxa – 1993–94
Juan Pablo Segovia – Puebla, Necaxa – 2021–22, 2022–
Leonardo Sequeira – Querétaro – 2022–
José Tiburcio Serrizuela – Veracruz – 1991/1992–93
Arnaldo Sialle – Irapuato – 1989–91
Darío Siviski – Toluca – 1984–85
Lucas Sparapani – Jaguares – 2005
Esteban Solari – Pumas – 2007–08
Jorge Solari – Torreón – 1971–72
Santiago Solari – Atlante – 2009–10
Gonzalo Sosa – Mazatlán – 2022
Ismael Sosa – Pumas, Tigres, Pachuca, León – 2014–16, 2016–18, 2019/2020–21, 2019–20
Carlos Squeo – Jalisco – 1979–80
Leonardo Suárez – América, Santos Laguna – 2020–21/2023–, 2022
José Carlos Tabares – Necaxa – 2003–04
Leonardo Tambussi – Dorados – 2005
Aníbal Tarabini – Torreón – 1971–73
Genaro Tedesco – Pumas – 1962–63
Hugo Tedesco – Atlante – 1971–76
Fernando Tobio – Toluca – 2018–19
Jonathan Torres – Querétaro – 2023–
Nicolás Torres – Atlante – 2010/2011/2012
Marco Torsiglieri – Morelia – 2015–16
Cristian Trapasso – Atlante, Toros Neza – 1993–94, 1995–96
Cristian Traverso – Gallos Blancos, Puebla – 2002–03, 2003–04
Octavio Trillini – América – 1958–59
Enrique Triverio – Toluca, Querétaro – 2015–19/2020–21, 2019–20
Cristian Trombetta – Jaguares – 2012–13
Enzo Trossero – Toluca – 1985–86
Franco Troyansky – Atlas – 2021–22
Martín Ubaldi – Atlas, Tigres, Atlante, Puebla, Pumas – 1993–95, 1995–96, 1996–98, 1999–00, 2000
Claudio Ubeda – Tampico Madero – 1994–95
Leonardo Ulloa – Pachuca – 2018–19
Carlos Uñate – América – 1958–59
Agustín Urzi – Juárez – 2023–
Oscar Ustari – Atlas, Pachuca – 2016–17, 2020–
Héctor Uzal – América – 1953–54
Lucas Valdemarín – San Luis – 2009
Carlos Valenzuela – Tijuana – 2023–
Leonel Vangioni – Monterrey – 2017–20
Miguel Ángel Vargas – Santos Laguna – 1998
Jorge Gabriel Vázquez – Morelia – 1996
Juan Carlos Veiga – Zacatepec, Atlas – 1975–76/1980–82, 1977–78
Héctor Veira – Laguna – 1971–72
Julián Velázquez – Cruz Azul, Tijuana, Querétaro – 2016–18, 2018–19, 2020
Leandro Velázquez – Veracruz – 2017
Néstor Verderi – América, Potosino, Deportivo Neza – 1974–76, 1976–79, 1979–85
Sergio Verdirame – Morelia, Monterrey, Cruz Azul, Santos Laguna – 1991–92, 1992–96/2002, 1996–97, 1997–98
Avelino Verón – León – 1980–82
Hernán Vigna – Necaxa, Puebla, Santos Laguna – 1999–00/2003, 2001, 2002
Federico Vilar – Atlante, Morelia, Atlas, Tijuana – 2003–10, 2010–13, 2014–15, 2015–16
Emanuel Villa – Atlas, Tecos, Cruz Azul, Pumas, Tigres, Querétaro – 2006, 2007, 2009–12, 2012, 2013–14, 2015–17
Lucas Villafáñez – Morelia – 2019–20
Facundo Villalba – Atlas – 1997–98
Martín Villalonga – Toros Neza – 1994–96
Daniel Villalva – Veracruz, Querétaro – 2014–18/2019, 2018–19
José Luis Villarreal – Pachuca – 1997
Pablo Vitti – Gallos Blancos – 2012
Agustín Vuletich – Veracruz – 2016–17
Axel Werner – San Luis – 2019–21
Daniel Willington – Veracruz – 1970–71
Javier Yacuzzi – Tijuana – 2011–12
Damián Zamogilny – Puebla, Estudiantes, Atlas – 2007–08, 2008–11, 2012
Julio Alberto Zamora – Cruz Azul – 1993–96
Juan Manuel Zandoná – Veracruz – 1997
Ariel Zárate – Toluca – 1996
Sergio Zárate – Necaxa, América, Puebla – 1994–97/1998–99, 1997–98, 2000–01
Hugo Zarich – Toluca – 1969–71
Héctor Zelada – América, Atlante – 1979–87, 1988–90
José Alfredo Zelaya – Atlante – 1999–00
Cristián Zermatten – Pumas – 1998/1999–00

Bolivia 
Joaquín Botero – Pumas – 2003–06
José Alfredo Castillo – Tecos – 2003–05/2011
José Luis Chávez – Atlas – 2013
Alejandro Chumacero – Puebla – 2018–20
Milton Coimbra – Puebla – 2002–03
Percy Colque – Tigres – 2001
Luis Haquin – Puebla – 2019
Fernando Ochoaizpur – Pumas – 1999–02
Ronald Raldes – Cruz Azul – 2009
Carlos Trucco – Pachuca, Cruz Azul – 1994–95, 1996–97

Brazil 
Adelino Batista da Silva Neto – León – 2000–01
Adelson Portela – Pumas – 1962–63
Aílton de Silva – Atlas, León, Pumas, San Luis – 2000, 2000–01, 2003–05/2007, 2006
Alan Santos – Veracruz – 2018
Alcindo – Jalisco, América – 1973, 1974–76
Alemão – Cruz Azul – 2015
Alexandre – Necaxa – 2004–05
Alex Fernandes – Morelia, Monterrey – 1999–02, 2003–05/2007
Allan Dellon – Gallos Blancos – 2003
Almir – Gallos Blancos, Atlas – 2002, 2004
Amaral – Leones Negros – 1981–85, 1987–88
Amarildo Soares – Puebla, Celaya, Tecos – 1992–94, 1995–96, 1996
Amauri Vital da Silva – León – 1977–80
Amaury Epaminondas – Oro, Toluca – 1962–65, 1966–70
Anderson Leite – Juárez – 2022
André Luiz Moreira – Jaguares – 2007–09
Antonio Carlos Santos – América, Tigres, Veracruz, Santos Laguna, Morelia, Atlante – 1987–94, 1994–95, 1995–96, 1998, 1999, 1999
Apodi – Querétaro – 2013–14
Babá – Pumas – 1962–67
Mário Baesso – América – 1968–69
Bahía – Monterrey – 1990–92
Batata – América – 1980–82
Bebeto – Toros Neza – 1999
Bianchezi – Monterrey, Veracruz – 1992–95/1997, 1995–96
Bianchini – Puebla – 1971–73
Bruno Pirri – Jaguares – 2014–15/2016–17
Oswaldo Faria – América – 1978–81, Tampico 1981–82
Bugre- Leones Negros – 1983–85
Cabinho – Pumas, Atlante, León, Tigres – 1974–79, 1979–83, 1983–85, 1986–88
Camilo Sanvezzo – Querétaro, Tijuana, Mazatlán, Toluca – 2014–19, 2019–20, 2020–21, 2022–
Candido – Pumas, Tecos, Campesinos, Toluca – 1975–77, 1977–79, 1980–81, 1981–82
Canhoteiro – Deportivo Nacional, Toluca – 1964, 1965
Carlito Peters – Oro, Pumas – 1960–61, 1961–64
Carlos Alberto Seixas – América, Atlante, Gallos Blancos – 1988–89, 1989–90, 1991–94
Carlos Augusto Gómes – Santos Laguna – 1999–02/2003
Carlos Eloir Perucci – Laguna, Atlético Español, Cruz Azul  – 1972–77, 1977–81, 1981–84
Chico – Querétaro – 2020–21
Christian Corrêa Dionisio – Pachuca – 2008
Claudio da Silva Pinto – Tampico Madero, Monarcas Morelia, Toros Neza, Monterrey, Pachuca, Puebla, La Piedad, Celaya, Colibríes – 1994–95, 1997/1998–99, 1997, 1999–00, 2000/2003–04, 2001, 2001–02, 2002, 2003
Cláudio Marques – Potosino – 1979–80
Clay Cassius Silva – Leones Negros – 1991–93
Cleomar – Morelia, Monterrey – 1997, 1998
Coutinho – Atlas – 1970–71
Dani Alves – Pumas – 2022–23
Danilinho – Jaguares, Tigres, Querétaro – 2008–10/2016, 2011/2013–14, 2014–15
Danilo Vergne – Atlas, Cruz Azul – 2005–06/2008, 2006
Dario – Monterrey – 1968
Denilson – Atlas – 2007
Deraldo Márquez – Leones Negros – 1993–94
Derley – León – 2014
Derley – Jaguares – 2016–17
Didi – Veracruz – 1965–66
Diego – Toluca – 2019/2021–22
Diogo – Pumas – 2021–
Dioney Carlos – Puebla, Tecos – 1992–94, 1994–95
Dirceu – América – 1978–79
Djalminha – América – 2004
Dória – Santos Laguna – 2018–
Edcarlos – Cruz Azul – 2010
Eder Pacheco – Morelia, Puebla – 2007–08, 2008–09
Edervaldo Lourenco – Leones Negros – 1993–94
Edmur Lucas – Tecos, Tigres, Tampico Madero – 1980–84, 1986–88, 1988–89
Edno – Tigres – 2012
Edú – América – 1989–92, 1994–95
Elías – Necaxa – 2005
Eliomar Marcón – Tecos, Santos Laguna – 2003–06, 2006–07
Elsinho – Juárez – 2019
Euzébio – Leones Negros, Monterrey, León – 1975–82, 1982–83, 1983–85
Everaldo – Querétaro – 2017–18
Everaldo Barbosa – Jaguares, Necaxa – 2004–06, 2007–11
Everaldo Ferreira – Puebla – 2009
Éverton – Tigres – 2010
Everton Bilher – San Luis – 2012
Fabiano Pereira – Necaxa, Puebla – 2004–08, 2008
Fábio Santos – Cruz Azul – 2015–16
Fabrício – Veracruz – 2019
Fantick – América – 2002–03
Fernandinho – Juárez – 2021
Flavio Barros – Necaxa – 2002
Flavio Rogerio – Monterrey, Dorados, Tigres, Puebla – 2000–04, 2006, 2007–08, 2011
Geraldo Furtado – León – 1979–82
Giovanni Augusto – Mazatlán – 2021
Giuliano Sabbatini – Pumas – 1997
Glauco dos Santos – Leones Negros – 1993–94
Alfredo Gottardi – Atlas, Veracruz – 1977–78, 1978–79
Guarací Barbosa – Monterrey, Tigres, Veracruz – 1969–76, 1976–77, 1977–79
Gustavo Ferrareis – Puebla – 2021–
Higor Meritão – Pumas – 2021–
Hugo Aparecido Matos – Leones Negros, Tigres, Tecos – 1990–93, 1993–94, 1994–95
Humaitá – Monterrey – 1962–64
Iarley – Dorados – 2004–05
Irênio Soares – Tigres, América, San Luis, Veracruz – 2001–05, 2005–06, 2006–07, 2007
Itamar Batista da Silva – Jaguares, Tigres – 2008–09, 2009–10
João Batista – León, Pumas, Colibríes – 1999–00, 2001, 2003
João Paulo – Leones Negros – 1983–84
João Vanderlei Mior – Atlas, León – 1992–93, 1993–94
Joãozinho – Morelia – 2008
José Santos Damasceno Filho (Tiba) – Pumas, Celaya, Atlante, Santos, Jaguares −1991-95, 1995–96 and 99–02, 1996–99,  2002, 2003–05
Juary – Tecos – 1979–80
Josiel da Rocha – Jaguares – 2009
Juninho – Tigres – 2010–18
Juninho – Tijuana – 2016
Cardoso Júnior – León – 2008–09
Júnior César – Santos Laguna – 2005
Keno – Atlas – 2015
Kléber Pereira – Tigres, Veracruz, América, Necaxa – 2003–04, 2004, 2005–06, 2006–07
Lalá – Atlas – 1961–63
Leandro Augusto – León, Pumas, Tijuana, Puebla – 2000, 2001–11 and 2014, 2011–12, 2013
Leandro Carrijó – Juárez – 2019 
Leandro Machado – Gallos Blancos – 2003
Leandro Rodrigues Tavares – Colibríes – 2003
Lenilson Batista – Jaguares – 2007–08
Léo Bonatini – San Luis – 2023–
Léo Coelho – San Luis – 2021–22
Leonel Bolsonello – Pumas, Veracruz – 1992–94, 1994–95
Levir Culpi – Atlante – 1979–80
Lucas Maia – Puebla – 2021–
Lucas Silva – Puebla, Toluca, Monterrey, Cruz Azul, Pachuca, Jaguares – 2011–12, 2012–13, 2013–15, 2015, 2016, 2017
Lucas Xavier – Juárez – 2019
Lucenilde Pereira – Jaguares – 2004
Lúcio Flávio – Atlas – 2011
Luisinho – América, Atlante, Tampico – 1976–79, 1979–81, 1981–82
Luiz Fumanchu – América – 1979–80
Maikon Leite – Atlas, Toluca – 2014, 2016
Maranhão – Cruz Azul – 2012–14
Marcelinho – Necaxa – 2004
Marcelo de Faria – América, Irapuato, San Luis – 1999–00, 2000–01, 2002–04
Marcelo Fernandes – Tigres, Santos Laguna – 2001–02, 2002
Marcelo Macedo – Atlas – 2005–06
Marcinho – Morelia – 2007
Marco Antonio de Almeida – Pumas, Pachuca – 1995–97, 1998
Marcos Antonio García Nascimento – Gallos Blancos – 2006–07
Marquinho – Puebla – 1996
Marquinho – León – 1995–96
Paulo Martorano – Oro – 1961
Mateus Gonçalves – Pachuca, Jaguares, Toluca, Tijuana – 2016, 2017, 2017, 2018
Matheus Ribeiro – Puebla – 2018
Maurilio Thomas – Tigres – 2002
Milton Antonio Nunes – Puebla, Celaya – 1991–94, 1995–96
Milton Cruz – Tecos – 1979–82
Müller – Atlante, Tecos – 1977–78, 1978–79
Muricy Ramalho – Puebla – 1979–84
Murilo Neto – Jaguares – 2016
Nenê Bonilha – Veracruz – 2019
Osmar – Morelia – 2005
Oswaldo Faria – América – 1978–81, Tampico 1981–82
Parraro – Puebla – 1983–84
Paulo Nagamura – Tigres – 2010
Paulinho – Dorados – 2004
Paulo Luiz Massariol – Leones Negros – 1984–85
Paulo Rocha – Toros Neza, Celaya – 1993, 1995–96
Paulo Valentim – Atlante – 1966–67
Pedro Raul – Juárez – 2021
Peu – Santos Laguna – 2014
Picolé – Puebla, Deportivo Neza – 1979–81, 1981–82
Rafael Carioca – Tigres – 2017–
Rafael Sóbis – Tigres – 2015–16
Rafinha – Jaguares – 2016
Reinaldo Gueldini – Tampico Madero – 1988
Reinaldo de Souza – Jaguares – 2004
Ricardo Jesus – Querétaro, Tijuana – 2014, 2015
Ricardo Wagner De Souza – Santos Laguna, Necaxa, León – 1993–97, 1997–98, 1999
Richardson – León – 1999
Robert de Pinho – Atlas, Monterrey, Tecos, América – 2004, 2008, 2008, 2009
Roberto de Moura – Pumas – 1997–98
Robson Luiz – Morelia, Santos Laguna – 1999–00, 2000–01
Rodrigo Dourado – San Luis – 2022–
Rodrigo Follé – Leones Negros – 2014
Rogério – Pumas – 2021–22
Rômulo Marques Antoneli – Atlas – 2010
Ronaldinho – Querétaro – 2014–15
Rosinei – América – 2009–12
Rubini – Nacional, Oro, Monterrey, Laguna – 1961–63, 1963–64, 1964–68, 1968–69
Samir – Tigres – 2022–
Sandro Coelho Leite – Pumas – 1992–94
Sandro Sotilli – Necaxa, Jaguares – 2004–05, 2006
Sebastião Pereira – Jaguares, Tigres, San Luis – 2004–05, 2005, 2006–07
Sergio Lima – Jalisco, Atlas, Morelia, Unión de Curtidores – 1976–80, 1980–81, 1981–82, 1983–84
Ivo Sodré – América – 1968–69
Spencer Coelho – Pumas, Tecos, Atlante, Toluca – 1975–77, 1977–78, 1978–81, 1982–82
Tiago Volpi – Querétaro, Toluca – 2015–18, 2022–
Tita – León, Puebla – 1990–94/1995–96, 1994–95
Tuca – Atlas, Pumas, Monterrey, Toluca – 1977–78, 1978–85/1990–91, 1986–87, 1987–90
Uidemar – León – 1993–95
Urubatão – América – 1961–62
Val Baiano – Monterrey – 2010
Valdir Papel – Dorados – 2005
Vanderlei da Silva – Leones Negros – 1993–94
Vavá – América – 1964–67
Victor Ramos – Monterrey – 2014
Vitinho – San Luis – 2022–
Vladimir Rosas – América – 1995
Wanderson – Morelia – 2007
Washington Luigi Garucia – Indios – 2008
William da Silva – Querétaro, América, Toluca – 2014–15, 2016–18, 2018–21
Wilson Tiago – Morelia, Toluca, Veracruz, Jaguares, Querétaro, Sinaloa – 2005–09, 2012–14, 2014–15, 2015, 2015, 2016
Yago – Lobos BUAP – 2018–19
Ygor Nogueira – Mazatlán – 2021–22
Zanata – Monterrey – 1978–81
Zé Roberto – León – 1991–93
Edson Zwaricz – Tecos, Monterrey, Dorados – 1993–95, 1998, 2005

Chile 
Joe Abrigo – Veracruz – 2018–19
Sergio Ahumada – Tecos – 1974–75
Marcelo Allende – Necaxa – 2018
Cristián Álvarez – Jaguares – 2009–10
Eduardo Arancibia – Atlas, León – 2000, 2001
Esteban Aránguiz – San Luis – 1973–74
Ángelo Araos – Necaxa – 2022–23
Jorge Aravena – Puebla – 1988–91
Pedro Araya – San Luis, Atlas – 1971–73, 1973–78
Francisco Arrué – Puebla – 2004
Claudio Baeza – Necaxa, Toluca – 2019–20, 2021–
Rodrigo Barrera – Necaxa – 1995–96
Marcelo Barticciotto – América – 1993–94
Ivo Basay – Necaxa – 1991–94
Jean Beausejour – América – 2009–10
Pedro Campos – Necaxa – 2019
Cristián Canío – Atlante – 2007
Bryan Carrasco – Veracruz – 2018–19
Juan Carreño – Pumas – 1994–95
Roberto Cartes – San Luis – 2002–03
Esteban Carvajal – Atlas – 2019
Bryan Carvallo – Necaxa – 2018–19/2021
Sandrino Castec – Cruz Azul – 1987–88
Nicolás Castillo – Pumas, América, Necaxa – 2017–18, 2019–20, 2022
Hernán Castro – Morelia – 1990–92
Luis Castro – Atlético Potosino – 1987–88
Osvaldo Castro – América, Jalisco, Deportivo Neza, Potosino, Pumas – 1972–75, 1975–79, 1979–81, 1981–82, 1983–84
Juan Cornejo – León – 2017–18
Víctor Dávila – Necaxa, Pachuca, León – 2017–18, 2019–20, 2021–
Juan Delgado – Necaxa – 2019–21
Isaac Díaz – Jaguares, Puebla – 2014–15, 2015
Marcelo Díaz – Pumas – 2017–18
Nicolás Díaz – Mazatlán, Tijuana – 2020–22, 2022–
Hugo Droguett – Tecos, Morelia, Cruz Azul – 2006–08, 2008–10, 2011
Fabián Estay – Toluca, América, Atlante, Santos Laguna – 1995–99/2004, 1999–01, 2002–03, 2003
Matías Fernández – Necaxa – 2017–19
Marco Antonio Figueroa – Morelia, América, Celaya – 1986–90/1993–97, 1990–91, 1998
Cristián Flores – Atlante, Irapuato – 2001, 2001
Felipe Flores – Tijuana, Veracruz – 2015, 2017
Edgardo Fuentes – León, Morelia – 1990–92, 1993–94
Ismael Fuentes – Jaguares, Atlas – 2005–08/2010–, 2009
Pablo Galdames – Cruz Azul, Veracruz – 2001–02/2003, 2002
Felipe Gallegos – Necaxa, San Luis – 2016–19, 2020–21
Miguel Ángel Gamboa – Tecos, América, Toros Neza – 1975–78, 1978–81, 1983–85
Gamadiel García – Necaxa – 2003–04
Lizardo Garrido – Santos Laguna – 1993
Aníbal González – Morelia, Monterrey – 1992–93, 1993–94/1994–95
Marcos González – Necaxa – 2016–17
Osvaldo González – Toluca – 2010–11/2016–19
Sebastián González – Atlante, Tigres, Veracruz, Tecos – 2002–05, 2006, 2007, 2008
Fabián Guevara – Monterrey – 1994–96
Juan Gutiérrez – Morelia, Toluca – 1990–91, 1992–94
Roberto Gutiérrez – Estudiantes, Atlante – 2009–10, 2014
Ángelo Henríquez – Atlas – 2018
David Henríquez – Morelia – 2004–05
Emilio Hernández – Cruz Azul – 2009
Alejandro Hisis – Monterrey, Tigres – 1990–92, 1993–94
Roberto Hodge – América, Tecos – 1970–74, 1974–77
Valber Huerta – Toluca – 2022–
Enrique Iturra – Pachuca – 1973
Manuel Iturra – Necaxa – 2016–17
Gonzalo Jara – Morelia, Mazatlán, Tijuana – 2020, 2020, 2021
Ignacio Jeraldino – Atlas, Santos Laguna – 2020, 2021–22
Francisco Las Heras – Tecos – 1975–77
Yerko Leiva – Necaxa – 2020–21
Juan Carlos Letelier – Cruz Azul – 1990–91
Igor Lichnovsky – Necaxa, Cruz Azul, Tigres – 2017–18, 2018–20, 2022–
Manuel López – Toluca, León – 1998, 2000
Mario Maldonado – Tecos, Deportivo Neza – 1975–79, 1979–85
Héctor Mancilla – Veracruz, Toluca, Tigres, Atlas, Morelia, Sinaloa – 2006–07, 2008–10, 2011–12/2016, 2012, 2013–14, 2015
Rubén Martínez – Santos Laguna, Tampico Madero – 1993–94, 1994–95
Nicolás Maturana – Necaxa – 2017
Eugenio Méndez – Laguna – 1973
Gabriel Mendoza – Tigres – 1997
Fernando Meneses – Veracruz – 2015–16
Jean Meneses – León, Toluca – 2018–22, 2022–
Rodrigo Millar – Atlas, Morelia, Mazatlán – 2013–15, 2015–20, 2020–21
Cristián Montecinos – Santos Laguna, Necaxa, Puebla – 1996–97, 2000, 2000
Joaquín Montecinos – Tijuana – 2022–
Felipe Mora – Cruz Azul, Pumas – 2017–18, 2018–19
Iván Morales – Cruz Azul – 2022–
Gustavo Moscoso – Puebla, Morelia, Tigres – 1986–89, 1989–90, 1991–92
Raúl Muñoz – San Luis – 2003
Reinaldo Navia – Tecos, Morelia, América, Monterrey, San Luis, Atlas – 2001–02, 2003, 2004–05, 2006, 2006, 2007
Manuel Neira – Jaguares – 2004
Claudio Núñez – Tigres, Puebla – 1997–98/1999–01, 2002–03
Juvenal Olmos – Irapuato – 1990–91
Patricio Ormazábal – Dorados – 2005
Andrés Oroz – Puebla – 2004
Esteban Paredes – Atlante, Querétaro – 2012–13, 2013–14
Pablo Parra – Puebla – 2021–
Nelson Parraguez – Necaxa – 2001
Esteban Pavez – Tijuana – 2021
Luis Pavez – Juárez – 2021
Eduardo Peralta San Luis, Potosino – 1972–74, 1974–76
José Pérez – Gallos Blancos – 2012
Miguel Pinto – Atlas – 2011–13/2015
Nelson Pinto – Tecos – 2005–08/2009/2011–12
Carlos Poblete – Puebla, Ángeles, Cruz Azul, Veracruz – 1986–87/1988–92/1995–96, 1987–88, 1992–93, 1993–95
Waldo Ponce – Cruz Azul – 2011–12
Edson Puch – Necaxa, Pachuca, Querétaro – 2016–17, 2017, 2018
Mariano Puyol – Cruz Azul – 1986–87
Alberto Quintano – Cruz Azul – 1971–77
Bryan Rabello – Santos Laguna, Pumas, Lobos BUAP – 2015–16, 2017, 2018–19
Jaime Ramírez – Monarcas Morelia, Toros Neza – 1992–93, 1993–95
Álvaro Ramos – León – 2017–18
Carlos Reinoso – América – 1970–79
Lorenzo Reyes – Atlas, Mazatlán – 2018–20, 2021
Enzo Roco – Cruz Azul – 2016–18
Juan Rodríguez – Atlético Español – 1973–78
Martín Rodríguez – Cruz Azul, Pumas, Morelia, Mazatlán – 2017–18, 2018–19, 2020, 2020
Juan Rojas – Potosino – 1988–89
Manuel Rojas – América – 1975–76
Ricardo Rojas – América, Necaxa – 2001–07/2009, 2007
Bruno Romo – Juárez – 2020
Eduardo Rubio – Cruz Azul – 2007
Patricio Rubio – Querétaro – 2015/2016
Rodrigo Ruiz – Puebla, Toros Neza, Santos Laguna, Tecos, Veracruz – 1994–96, 1996–99, 2000–06/2010–11, 2007/2008–10/2011–12, 2008
Cristian Saavedra – Santos Laguna – 1988–89
Ángelo Sagal – Pachuca, Juárez – 2017–19, 2019–20
Omar Sandoval – Monterrey, Tecos – 1976–77, 1978–79
Nelson Sanhueza – Monterrey, Potosino, Puebla, Correcaminos – 1977–79, 1980–82/1986–87, 1982–85, 1987–88
Álvaro Sarabia – Jaguares – 2005
José Luis Sierra – Tigres – 1999
Francisco Silva – Jaguares, Cruz Azul – 2015–16, 2016–18
Eduardo Soto – América – 1995
Humberto Suazo – Monterrey – 2007–09/2010–14
Christian Torres – León, América, Monterrey – 1995–97/2000, 1998, 1999
Cristopher Toselli – Atlas – 2018
Ariel Uribe – Morelia – 2019
Diego Valdés – Morelia, Santos Laguna, América – 2016–18, 2019–21, 2022–
Jorge Valdivia – Morelia, Mazatlán, Necaxa – 2020, 2020, 2022
Gino Valentini – Irapuato – 1988–89
René Valenzuela – Ángeles – 1987–88
Rodrigo Valenzuela – América, León, Atlas, Veracruz – 1998/2004–05, 2001–02, 2002–04, 2006
Eduardo Vargas – Tigres – 2017–20
Sebastián Vegas – Morelia, Monterrey – 2016–20, 2020–
Juan Carlos Vera – Cruz Azul, Morelia, Tampico Madero, Pumas, Atlas – 1986–87, 1987–88, 1988–90, 1990–91/1992–93, 1991–92
Sergio Vergara – Pachuca – 2017
Mathías Vidangossy – Jaguares, Pumas – 2015, 2016
Eduardo Vilches – Necaxa – 1994–99
José Luis Villanueva – Morelia – 2006
Richard Zambrano – Santos Laguna, Celaya, Pumas – 1993–95, 1995–96, 1998–99
Iván Zamorano – América – 2001–02
Dilan Zúñiga – León – 2019

Colombia
Herly Alcázar – Jaguares – 2006
Carlos Augusto Álvarez – Necaxa – 2001
Diego Álvarez – San Luis – 2009
Yulián Anchico – Pachuca – 2011
Andrés Andrade – América, Jaguares, León, Atlas – 2013–14/2015–16, 2014–15, 2016–18, 2018–19
Brayan Angulo – Jaguares, Puebla, Tijuana, Toluca – 2016–17, 2017–20, 2021–22, 2022–
Jeison Angulo – Pumas – 2019
Carlos Arango – Morelia – 1959
Cristian Arango – Pachuca – 2023–
Luis Carlos Arias – Toluca – 2011
Franco Arizala – Pachuca, Jaguares, León, Atlas, Puebla – 2010–11, 2011–13/2014–15/2017, 2013–14, 2015–16, 2016
Yovanny Arrechea – León – 2013–
Eudalio Arriaga – Puebla – 2003–05
Miguel Asprilla – Santos Laguna – 1994–97
Yuber Asprilla – Pumas – 2018
Kevin Balanta – Tijuana, Querétaro – 2019–20, 2021–
Jaine Barreiro – Atlas, Pachuca, León – 2016–18, 2018–19, 2020–
Nicolás Benedetti – América, Mazatlán – 2019–21, 2022–
Cristian Borja – Toluca – 2018–19
Hernán Burbano – León, Tigres, Atlas – 2012–13/2015–18, 2013–15, 2019
Andrés Cadavid – San Luis – 2012
José Caicedo – Pumas – 2022–
Juan Caicedo – Santos Laguna – 2016
Juan José Calero – Pachuca, León – 2015–17, 2018–19
Miguel Calero – Pachuca – 2000–11
Yerson Candelo – Querétaro – 2015–18
Edwin Cardona – Monterrey, Pachuca, Tijuana – 2015–17, 2019, 2020
Jown Cardona – León – 2019–20
Fabián Castillo – Tijuana, Querétaro, Juárez – 2018–19/2020–21/2022–23, 2019–20, 2021–22
Jairo Castillo – Gallos Blancos – 2011
Alex Castro – Cruz Azul – 2020
Carlos Castro – Necaxa – 2002
Edwuin Cetré – Santos Laguna – 2018
Yimmi Chará – Monterrey, Sinaloa – 2015/2016–17, 2016
Andrés Chitiva – Pachuca, Indios, América, Atlas – 2001–08/2011, 2008, 2009, 2010
Wilman Conde – Atlas – 2011
Jonathan Copete – Pachuca – 2019–20
Jhersson Córdoba – San Luis – 2013
Jhon Córdoba – Jaguares – 2012–13
Efraín Cortés – Gallos Blancos, Pachuca, Puebla – 2011–12, 2013–14, 2014–15
Wilberto Cosme – Gallos Blancos, Chiapas, Puebla – 2013, 2014, 2014–15
Jefferson Cuero – Morelia – 2015–17
Mauricio Cuero – Santos Laguna, Tijuana, Atlas – 2016–17, 2017, 2019–20
Gustavo Culma – Necaxa – 2018
Ayron del Valle – Querétaro, Juárez – 2019, 2021
Jefferson Duque – Atlas, Morelia – 2015–16/2018, 2018
Jhon Duque – San Luis – 2021
Omar Fernández – Puebla, León – 2018–21/2022–, 2021–22
Delio Gamboa Rentería – Oro – 1959–60
Martín García – Necaxa – 2007
Juan Diego González – Santos Laguna – 2006
Wilder Guisao – Toluca – 2015
Carlos Gutiérrez – Necaxa – 2002–03
Teofilo Gutierrez – Cruz Azul – 2013
René Higuita – Veracruz – 1997–98
Fredy Hinestroza – Santos Laguna, Veracruz – 2016, 2017
Marino Hinestroza – Pachuca – 2022–
Avilés Hurtado – Pachuca, Jaguares, Tijuana, Monterrey – 2013/2014/2021–, 2013–14/2015–16, 2016–17, 2017–21
Andrés Ibargüen – América, Santos Laguna – 2018–20, 2021
Leiton Jiménez – Jaguares, Veracruz, Tijuana, Atlas, Lobos BUAP – 2012–13, 2013–15/2019, 2015–16, 2016–18, 2019
Eisner Iván Loboa – León, Puebla, Atlas, Morelia – 2012–14, 2014–15, 2015, 2016
Harold Lozano – América, Pachuca – 1995–96, 2003–04
Jeison Lucumí – Querétaro – 2019–20
Mauro Manotas – Tijuana, Atlas – 2021–22, 2022–
Vladimir Marín – Toluca – 2009–10
Cristian Marrugo – Pachuca, Veracruz, Puebla – 2013, 2013, 2017–18/2019–20
Cristian Martínez – Veracruz – 2014/2016
Jackson Martínez – Jaguares – 2010–12
Roger Martínez – América – 2018–
Stefan Medina – Monterrey, Pachuca – 2014–15/2017–, 2016–17
Alexander Mejía – Monterrey, León – 2015, 2016–18
Daley Mena – Gallos Blancos – 2011–12
Yorleys Mena – Morelia – 2015
Alexis Mendoza – Veracruz – 1997
Francisco Meza – Pumas, Tigres – 2016, 2017–21
Félix Micolta – Jaguares, Puebla – 2017, 2017–18
Mauricio Molina – Morelia – 2003–04
Jhon Mondragón – Puebla – 2017
Víctor Montaño – Toluca – 2015
Neider Morantes – Atlante – 2000–01
Wilson Morelo – Monterrey, Sinaloa, Pachuca – 2014, 2016, 2016
Dayro Moreno – Tijuana – 2011–12/2014–16
Leonardo Fabio Moreno – América, Celaya, Jaguares – 2000/2001, 2001, 2002
Marlos Moreno – Santos Laguna – 2019
Tressor Moreno – Necaxa, Veracruz, San Luis – 2005–06, 2006–07, 2007–10
Yairo Moreno – León, Pachuca – 2018–21/2022–, 2021–22
Andrés Mosquera – León, Toluca – 2017–22, 2022–
Aquivaldo Mosquera – Pachuca, América, Jaguares – 2005–07/2014–16, 2009–14, 2017
Dairon Mosquera – Pachuca – 2018
Santiago Mosquera – Pachuca – 2021
Jefferson Murillo – Veracruz – 2017–19
Miguel Murillo – Veracruz – 2018
Óscar Murillo – Pachuca – 2016–
Francisco Nájera – Gallos Blancos – 2006–07
Andrés Orozco – Dorados, Morelia – 2004–06, 2006–07
Michael Javier Ortega – Atlas – 2010–11
Wilmer Ortegón – Atlante, Tecos, Jaguares – 2000, 2001–02, 2002
José Ortíz – Morelia, Mazatlán – 2019–20, 2020–21
Humberto Osorio – Tijuana – 2015
Juan Otero – Santos Laguna, América – 2021–22, 2022
Franky Oviedo – América, Puebla, Pachuca, Necaxa – 2000–04, 2004–05, 2005, 2006–07
Dorlan Pabón – Monterrey – 2013/2014–21
Jhon Pajoy – Pachuca, Puebla – 2014, 2014–15
William Palacios – Lobos BUAP – 2017
Felipe Pardo – Toluca, Pachuca – 2019–20/2021, 2020–21
Jairo Patiño – San Luis – 2008–09
Edixon Perea – Cruz Azul – 2011–12
Geisson Perea – Pachuca – 2022
Luis Amaranto Perea – Cruz Azul – 2012–14
Luis Carlos Perea – Toros Neza – 1994–95
Alexis Pérez – Querétaro – 2017–19
Juan David Pérez – Tijuana, Veracruz, Pachuca – 2016, 2016, 2018
Harold Preciado – Santos Laguna – 2022–
Deinner Quiñones – Santos Laguna – 2018–19
Julián Quiñones – Tigres, Lobos BUAP, Atlas – 2016–17/2018–21, 2017–18, 2021–
Luis Quiñones – Tigres, Pumas, Lobos BUAP, Toluca – 2016–17/2019–, 2016, 2017, 2018
Darwin Quintero – Santos Laguna, América – 2009–14, 2015–18
Aldo Leão Ramírez – Morelia, Atlas, Cruz Azul – 2008–14, 2014–15, 2016
Michael Rangel – Mazatlán – 2021
Andrés Rentería – Santos Laguna, Querétaro, Cruz Azul – 2013–16, 2016–17, 2018
John Restrepo – Cruz Azul, Tigres, Veracruz – 2003–06, 2006–07, 2007–
Luis Gabriel Rey – Atlante, Morelia, Pachuca, Jaguares, América, Puebla – 2003–04/2008–09, 2005–07/2009–11/2016–17, 2007–08, 2011–13, 2013–14, 2015, 
Juan Reyes Grueso – Tecos – 1995
Duvier Riascos – Puebla, Tijuana, Pachuca, Morelia – 2011, 2012–13, 2013, 2014–15
Richard Ríos – Mazatlán – 2021–22
Christian Rivera – Tijuana, Querétaro – 2020–22, 2023–
Yamilson Rivera – León – 2014–15
Hugo Rodallega – Monterrey, Atlas, Necaxa – 2006/2007, 2006, 2007–08
Arley Rodríguez – Lobos BUAP – 2018
Emerson Rodríguez – Santos Laguna – 2023–
Joao Rodríguez – Necaxa – 2020
Efraín Sánchez – Atlas – 1958–60
Jorge Segura – Atlas – 2019
Mauricio Serna – Puebla – 2002–03
William Tesillo – León – 2018–
Edison Toloza – Morelia, Puebla – 2012, 2012
Macnelly Torres – San Luis – 2011
Santiago Tréllez – San Luis, Morelia – 2012–13, 2013–14
Fernando Uribe – Toluca – 2015–18
Mateus Uribe – América – 2017–19
Albeiro Usuriaga – Necaxa – 1995–96
Rafael Valek – Oro, Irapuato – 1955–56, 1956–57
Carlos Valencia – Jaguares – 2016
Iván Valenciano – Veracruz, Morelia – 1997, 1998
Óscar Vanegas – Toluca – 2021–22
Camilo Vargas – Atlas – 2019–
Omar Vásquez – Querétaro – 2013
Duván Vergara – Monterrey – 2021–
Edgar Zapata – Necaxa, Veracruz – 2006, 2007
José Zúñiga – Querétaro – 2023–

Ecuador 
Gabriel Achilier – Morelia – 2017–20
Alex Aguinaga – Necaxa, Cruz Azul – 1989–03, 2003–04
Juan Anangonó – Leones Negros – 2015
Bryan Angulo – Cruz Azul, Tijuana – 2019/2021–22, 2020
José Angulo – Querétaro – 2022
Julio Angulo – Tijuana – 2018
Vinicio Angulo – León – 2019
Michael Arroyo – San Luis, Atlante, América – 2010–11, 2012/2014, 2014–17
Nicolás Asencio – Tecos – 1999
Jaime Ayoví – Toluca, Pachuca, Tijuana – 2011, 2011–12, 2014
José Ayoví – Tijuana, Chiapas – 2015, 2016
Walter Ayoví – Monterrey, Pachuca, Sinaloa – 2009–13/2016–17, 2013–15, 2015
Manu Balda – Atlas – 2019–20
Christian Benítez – Santos Laguna, América – 2007–09/2010–11, 2011–13
Jonathan Betancourt – Querétaro – 2020
Luis Bolaños – Atlas – 2012
Miler Bolaños – Tijuana – 2017–20
Félix Borja – Puebla, Pachuca – 2011/2013–14, 2011–12
Jonathan Borja – Cruz Azul – 2020
Geovanny Caicedo – Irapuato – 2001
Jordy Caicedo – Tigres – 2022
Luis Caicedo – Veracruz – 2018–19
Marcos Caicedo – León, Sinaloa – 2014–15, 2015
Marcello Capirossi – Pumas, Pachuca, Santos Laguna – 1991-93, 1997–98
Byron Castillo – León – 2022–
Erick Castillo – Tijuana, Santos Laguna, Juárez – 2018–19/2021, 2019–20, 2020–21
Segundo Castillo – Pachuca, Puebla, Sinaloa – 2011–12, 2013, 2015–16
Aníbal Chalá – Toluca, Atlas – 2019–20, 2021–
Alex Colón – Pachuca – 2014
Washington Corozo – Pumas – 2021–22
Gabriel Cortez – Lobos BUAP – 2018
Bryan de Jesús – Necaxa – 2018
Marlon de Jesús – Monterrey, Puebla – 2013–14, 2014
Agustín Delgado – Pumas, Necaxa, Cruz Azul – 1998, 1999–01, 2004
Alexander Domínguez – Monterrey – 2016–17
Rómulo Dudar Mina – Jalisco – 1975
Giovanny Espinoza – Monterrey – 2001
Michael Estrada – Toluca, Cruz Azul – 2020–21, 2022–
Ítalo Estupiñán Toluca, América, Querétaro, Puebla – 1974–77, 1978–79, 1980–82, 1982–83
Carlos Garces Toluca – 1975
Francisco Gómez Portocarrero – Irapuato – 2000–01
Jonathan González – Leones Negros, León – 2015, 2015–16
Juan Govea – Morelia – 2013–14
Ariel Graziani – Veracruz, Morelia – 1998, 1998–99
Jorge Guagua – Atlante – 2012
Fernando Guerrero – Leones Negros – 2015
Yeison Guerrero – Veracruz – 2019
Joffre Guerrón – Tigres, Cruz Azul, Pumas – 2014–15, 2016, 2017
Eduardo Hurtado – Correcaminos – 1994
Iván Hurtado – Celaya, Tigres, La Piedad, Pachuca – 1995–98, 1999–01, 2001, 2004–05
Renato Ibarra – América, Atlas, Tijuana –  2016–19/2021, 2020–21, 2022
Romario Ibarra – Pachuca – 2019–
Jefferson Intriago – Juárez, Mazatlán – 2019–21, 2022–
Carlos Alberto Juárez – Santos Laguna – 1995–96
Anderson Julio – San Luis – 2020–21
Iván Kaviedes – Puebla – 2003
Fernando León – San Luis – 2020/2022
Fidel Martínez – Tijuana, Leones Negros, Pumas, Atlas, Querétaro – 2012–14/2021, 2014–15, 2015–16, 2017, 2022
Ángel Mena – Cruz Azul, León – 2017–18, 2019–
Edison Méndez – Irapuato, Santos Laguna – 2004, 2004
Kevin Mercado – Necaxa – 2019–21
Narciso Mina – América, Atlante – 2013, 2014
Jefferson Montero – Morelia, Querétaro – 2012–14, 2021–22
Carlos Morán – Toros Neza – 2001
Jefferson Orejuela – Querétaro – 2020
Cristian Penilla – Pachuca, Morelia – 2015, 2016–17
Jonathan Perlaza – Querétaro – 2020–21/2023–
Joao Plata – Toluca – 2020–21
Ayrton Preciado – Santos Laguna – 2018–22
Pedro Quiñónez – Santos Laguna – 2009
David Quiroz – Atlante – 2013
Jordan Rezabala – Tijuana – 2020
Joao Rojas – Morelia, Cruz Azul – 2011–13, 2013–17
Joao Rojas – Monterrey – 2022–
Luis Saritama – Tigres, América – 2006, 2007
Jordan Sierra – Lobos BUAP, Querétaro, Tigres, Toluca, Juárez – 2018, 2019, 2020–21, 2022, 2023–
Júnior Sornoza – Pachuca, Tijuana – 2015, 2021
Christian Suárez – Necaxa, Santos Laguna, Pachuca, Atlas, Sinaloa – 2011, 2011–2012, 2013, 2015, 2015
Félix Torres– Santos Laguna – 2019–
Antonio Valencia – Querétaro – 2021
Enner Valencia – Pachuca, Tigres – 2014, 2017–20
Armando Wila – Puebla – 2012

Paraguay 
Danilo Aceval – Tigres – 2000–01
Jorge Achucarro – Atlas – 2008–10
Jorge Aguilar – Querétaro, Tijuana, Necaxa – 2020, 2020, 2021
Pablo Aguilar – San Luis, Tijuana, América, Cruz Azul – 2009–10, 2012–13/2018, 2014–17, 2018–22
Guido Alvarenga – León – 2001–02
Blas Armoa – Juárez – 2020–21
Erwin Ávalos – Santos Laguna, Toluca – 2005, 2007
Adam Bareiro – Monterrey, San Luis – 2019, 2021
Fredy Bareiro – Estudiantes – 2008–10/2012
Néstor Bareiro – San Luis – 2009
Sergio Bareiro – Necaxa – 2021
Lucas Barrios – Atlas – 2007
Édgar Benítez – Pachuca, Toluca, Querétaro – 2009–11, 2012–15, 2015–18
Jorge Benítez – Cruz Azul, Monterrey – 2015–17, 2017–18
Pedro Benítez – Tigres – 2008–09
Rafael Bobadilla – Leones Negros – 1993–94
Ariel Bogado – Atlas, Tigres – 2008, 2009
Carlos Bonet – Cruz Azul – 2007–09
Hugo Brizuela – Pachuca – 2001–02
Luis Caballero – Atlas – 2014–16
Pablo Caballero – Pumas, Puebla – 2000, 2001–03
Salvador Cabañas – Jaguares, América – 2003–06, 2006–10
Marcos Candia – América – 1953–54
Salustiano Candia – Veracruz, Atlante – 2008, 2014
Adolfino Cañete – Cruz Azul – 1984–85
Gustavo Cañete – América, Atlante, Veracruz – 1999, 1999–00, 2002
Denis Caniza – Santos Laguna, Cruz Azul, Atlas – 2001–05, 2005–06/2007–08, 2006–07
José Cardozo – Toluca – 1994–05
Luis Cardozo – Morelia – 2014–15
Herminio Céspedes – Cruz Azul, San Luis, Puebla – 1974–76, 1976–77, 1977–78
Roberto Cino – Cruz Azul, Monterrey – 1981–82, 1982–83
Josué Colmán – Mazatlán – 2022–
Nelson Cuevas – Pachuca, América, Puebla – 2005–06, 2006–07, 2011
Paulo da Silva – Toluca, Pachuca – 2003–09/2013–17, 2012–13
Sergio Díaz – América – 2020
Félix de Jesús Díaz Núñez – Santos Laguna – 1988–89
José Doldán – Necaxa, Querétaro – 2020, 2020–21
Cecilio Domínguez – América, Santos Laguna – 2017–19, 2022–
Juan Escobar – Cruz Azul – 2019–
Marcelo Estigarribia – Jaguares – 2017
Jonathan Fabbro – Jaguares, Lobos BUAP – 2016–17, 2017
Fernando Fernández – Tigres – 2016
Sebastián Ferreira – Morelia – 2018–20
Walter Fretes – Jaguares – 2007
Carlos González – Necaxa, Pumas, Tigres, Toluca – 2017–18, 2018–20, 2021–22, 2022–
Julio González – Necaxa – 2020–21
Walter González – Pachuca, León – 2018, 2018–19
Alfredo Haywood – Tecos – 1979–80
Juan Iturbe – Tijuana, Pumas, Pachuca – 2017–18, 2018–19/2020–21, 2020
Carlos Jara Saguier – Cruz Azul – 1975–83
Apolinor Jiménez – Cruz Azul, Puebla, Monterrey – 1973–75, 1975–77, 1977–79
Hugo Kiesse – América, Tecos, Atlas – 1975–78, 1978–85, 1986–87
Adolfo Lazzarini – Cruz Azul – 1977–78
Darío Lezcano – Juárez – 2019–23
Dante López – Pumas – 2008–11/2014–16
Manuel Maciel – Toluca – 2008
Julio César Manzur – Pachuca – 2007–08
Líder Mármol – Atlante – 2010–11
Cris Martínez – Santos Laguna – 2018
Emilio Damián Martínez – Santos Laguna – 2006
Nicolás Martínez – Puebla – 2009
Osvaldo Martínez – Monterrey, Atlante, América, Santos Laguna, Atlas, Puebla, Querétaro – 2009–11, 2011–2012, 2013–16, 2017–18, 2019, 2020, 2021
Atilio Mellone – Oro – 1945–48
William Mendieta – Juárez – 2020–21
Alfredo Mendoza – Atlas – 1994–95
Luis Miño – Jaguares – 2017
Herminio Miranda – Puebla – 2012–13
Luis Alberto Monzón – Cruz Azul – 1991–92/1993–94
Sergio Nichiporuk – Atlante – 1987–88
Celso Ortiz – Monterrey – 2016–
Richard Ortiz – Toluca – 2013–16
Hugo Ovelar – Santos Laguna – 1999–00
Roberto Ovelar – Cruz Azul – 2009
Juan Patiño – Jaguares – 2016–17
Iván Piris – Monterrey, León – 2016–17, 2017–18
Gastón Puerari – Atlas – 2011
Gustavo Ramírez – Pachuca – 2016
Robin Ramírez – Pumas – 2013
Jorge Rojas – Querétaro, Tijuana – 2019, 2019
Rodrigo Rojas – Monterrey – 2014
Sindulfo Rojas – Atlas – 1979–82
Ángel Romero – Cruz Azul – 2022
Julio César Romero – Puebla – 1989–90
Luis Romero – Santos Laguna, Jaguares – 2000–03, 2003
Cristian Riveros – Cruz Azul – 2007–10
Rubén Ruiz Díaz – Monterrey, Puebla, Necaxa – 1992–98, 1999, 2003–04
Santiago Salcedo – Jaguares – 2007
Adriano Samaniego – Necaxa – 1986–88
Braian Samudio – Toluca – 2021–22
Juan Samudio – Gallos Blancos – 2007
Miguel Samudio – América, Querétaro – 2015–17, 2018–19
Baudelio Sanabria – Atlas – 1979–80
Richard Sánchez – América – 2019–
Roque Santa Cruz – Cruz Azul – 2015
Pedro Sarabria – Jaguares – 2002–03
Antony Silva – Puebla – 2021–
Silvio Torales – Pumas – 2015
Aureliano Torres – Toluca – 2011–12
Eligio Torres – Cruz Azul, Potosino, Santos Laguna – 1982–84, 1984–85/1986–89, 1989–90
Bruno Váldez – América – 2016–22
Diego Valdez – San Luis – 2019
Pablo Velázquez – Toluca, Morelia, Necaxa – 2013–14, 2015–16, 2017
Víctor Velázquez – Lobos BUAP, Juárez – 2019, 2019–21
Eladio Vera – Cruz Azul, Tecos – 1971–77, 1977–79
Enrique Vera – América, Atlas – 2008–09, 2010
Darío Verón – Pumas – 2003–17
Enrique Villalba – Tecos, Tampico – 1979–82, 1982–83
Héctor Villalba – Tijuana – 2016
Javier Villalba – Cruz Azul – 1982–83
Julio César Yegros – Cruz Azul, Tecos – 1995–96/1997–99/2000, 1997
Pablo Zeballos – Cruz Azul – 2008–09

Peru 
Luis Abram – Cruz Azul – 2022
Luis Advíncula – Tigres, Lobos BUAP – 2017, 2017–18
Wilmer Aguirre – San Luis – 2010–12
Pedro Aquino – Lobos BUAP, León, América – 2017–18, 2018–20, 2021–
Eugenio Arenaza – América, León, Toluca – 1950–51, -, –
Edgar Astudillo – Tigres – 1980–81
Irven Ávila – Lobos BUAP, Morelia – 2018, 2018–19
Julio Ayllón – Moctezuma, Veracruz, León, Tampico – 1946–49, 1949–50, 1950–51, 1952–54
Héctor Bailetti – Atlante, Zacatepec – 1975–76, 1976–77
Álvaro Barco – Tampico Madero – 1994–95
Gerónimo Barbadillo – Tigres – 1977–82
Eddy Carazas – Tigres – 1998
Carlos Carbonell – Atlas – 1974–75
Wilder Cartagena – Veracruz – 2018
Pedro Chinchay – Tigres – 1980–82
Héctor Chumpitaz – Atlas – 1975–77
Guillermo Correa – Torreón, Irapuato – 1969–71, 1971–72
Christian Cueva – Toluca, Pachuca – 2015–16, 2020
Martín Dallorso – Gallos Blancos, Tecos – 1993–94, 1994–96
Raúl de Alva – América – 1953–54
Beto da Silva – Lobos BUAP – 2019
Guillermo del Valle – Atlas – 1950–51
Alejandro Duarte – Lobos BUAP – 2019
Alfonso Dulanto – Pumas – 1996–97
Johan Fano – Atlante – 2010
Edison Flores – Morelia, Atlas – 2018–19, 2022–
Pedro Gallese – Veracruz – 2016–18
Carlos García Carrasco – Toluca, Laguna, Torreón – 1968–69, 1969–71, 1971
Alexi Gómez – Atlas – 2018
Grimaldo González – ADO, Veracruz, Tampico – 1946–47, 1947–49, 1952–54
Ernesto Labarthe – Monterrey – 1980–81
Rufino Lecca – Veracruz – 1944–46
Hugo Lobatón – Torreón – 1968–70
Flavio Maestri – San Luis – 2002
Eduardo Malásquez – Atlas – 1988–89
Reimond Manco – Atlante – 2011
Juan Carlos Mariño – Gallos Blancos – 2013
Andrés Mendoza – Morelia, Atlante – 2008–09, 2012
Juan José Muñante – Atlético Español, Pumas UNAM, Tampico – 1973–76, 1976–80, 1980–82
Franco Navarro – Tecos – 1987–88
Juan Carlos Oblitas – Veracruz – 1975–77
Percy Olivares – Cruz Azul – 1997
Santiago Ormeño – Puebla, León, Guadalajara, Juárez – 2018–21, 2021–22, 2022, 2023–
Walter Ormeño – América, Zacatepec, Atlante, Morelia – 1957–59/1961–62, 1959–60, 1962–63, 1963–64
Juan Pajuelo – Atlas – 2002
Roberto Palacios – Puebla, Tecos, Morelia, Atlas – 1997, 1998–02, 2003/2004, 2003
Constantino Perales – León – 1957–62
Andy Polo – Morelia – 2017
Tulio Quiñones – Orizaba, Veracruz, Necaxa – 1947–49, 1949–51, 1952–53
Oswaldo Ramírez – Atlético Español – 1975–77
Christian Ramos – Veracruz – 2018
Juan Reynoso – Cruz Azul, Necaxa – 1994–02, 2002–04
Raúl Ruidíaz – Morelia – 2016–18
Joel Sánchez – Querétaro – 2018
Ray Sandoval – Morelia – 2018–19
Anderson Santamaría – Puebla, Atlas – 2018, 2019–
Iván Santillán – Veracruz – 2019
Roberto Silva – San Luis – 2003
Jorge Soto – San Luis – 2003
José Soto – Puebla, Celaya – 1996–98, 1999–00
Julio César Uribe – América, Tecos – 1987–88, 1989–91
Carlos Valdivia – Veracruz – 1944–46
Walter Vílchez – Cruz Azul, Puebla – 2007, 2007–09
Julio Villanueva – Torreón – 1968–69
Alfonso Yañez – Gallos Blancos – 1993–94
Yoshimar Yotún – Cruz Azul – 2019–21

Uruguay 
Sebastián Abreu – Tecos, Cruz Azul, América, Dorados, Monterrey, San Luis, Tigres – 1999–00/2004, 2002–03, 2003, 2005–06, 2006, 2007, 2007
Eduardo Acevedo – Tecos – 1987–90
Alejandro Acosta – Puebla – 2009–11
Luis Alberto Acosta – América – 1984–85
Rafael Acosta – Veracruz – 2016–17
Nilo Acuña – Monterrey – 1972–75
Washington Aguerre – Querétaro – 2021–
Cono Aguiar – Veracruz – 1995–96
Carlos Aguilera – Tecos – 1987–88
Rodrigo Aguirre – Necaxa, Monterrey – 2021–22, 2022–
Matías Aguirregaray – Tijuana – 2017
Nelson Alaguich – Atlas – 1984–85/1986–87
Martín Alaniz – Morelia – 2014
Nicolás Albarracín – Querétaro – 2020
Juan Albín – Veracruz – 2015–18
Gerardo Alcoba – Pumas, Santos Laguna – 2015–17, 2018
Diego Alonso – Pumas – 2004–05
Iván Alonso – Toluca – 2011–12
Lucero Álvarez – Lobos BUAP – 2017–18
Mario Andrés Álvarez – Indios – 2008
Antonio Alzamendi – Tecos – 1983–84
Maximiliano Araújo – Puebla, Toluca – 2020–22, 2023–
Egidio Arévalo – Monterrey, San Luis, Tijuana, Tigres, Atlas, Jaguares, Veracruz – 2007–08, 2009, 2011–12, 2014, 2014–15, 2016, 2016, 2017
Maximiliano Arias – Gallos Blancos – 2011–12
Ramón Arias – Puebla – 2015–16
Facundo Barceló – Atlas – 2019
Facundo Batista – Necaxa – 2021–
Jorge Bava – Atlas – 2008
Francisco Bertocchi – Monterrey – 1974–77
Gustavo Biscayzacú – Veracruz, Atlante, Necaxa – 2004–06, 2006–07, 2008
Joe Bizera – Atlante – 2013
Sergio Blanco – América, San Luis, Dorados, Gallos Blancos, Necaxa – 2003, 2004, 2006, 2010, 2011
Julián Bonifacino – Atlas – 1972–73
Ricardo Brandon – Veracruz, Toluca, Potosino, Campesinos, Oaxtepec – 1975–78, 1978–80, 1980–81, 1981–82, 1982–83
Matías Britos – León, Pumas, Querétaro – 2012–14, 2014–17, 2018–19
Carlos Bueno – Gallos Blancos – 2011–12
Hugo Cabezas – Puebla – 1980–81
Javier Cabrera – Toluca – 2018
Jorge Daniel Cabrera – Gallos Blancos, Correcaminos – 1990–91, 1991–93
Wilmar Cabrera – Necaxa – 1989–90
Pablo Cáceres – Puebla – 2017
Sebastián Cáceres – América – 2020–
Washington Camacho – Tijuana – 2019
José Cancela – Puebla – 2000–01
Julio Canessa – Atlas, Tecos, Necaxa, León, Potosino, Atlante – 1979–81, 1981–82, 1982–83, 1983–84, 1984–85, 1987–88
James Cantero – Correcaminos – 1995
Alberto Cardaccio – Curtidores, Atlas, Puebla, Monterrey – 1975–77, 1977–78, 1978–79, 1979–82
Mathías Cardaccio – Atlante, Sinaloa – 2010–11, 2016
Gonzalo Carneiro – Cruz Azul – 2022–
Juan Ramón Carrasco – Tecos – 1982–83
Juan Guillermo Castillo – Gallos Blancos – 2012–13
Facundo Castro – Necaxa – 2018–19
William Castro – Cruz Azul – 1990–91
Gabriel Cedrés – América – 1997–98
Pablo Ceppelini – Cruz Azul – 2020
Diego Cháves – Gallos Blancos – 2009
Gonzalo Choy González – Morelia, Monterrey – 2007–08, 2008
Fabián Coito – Pachuca – 1996
Romeo Corbo – Monterrey – 1974–80
Julio César Cortés – Atlante – 1973
Enrique Cremonini – Atlante – 1968–71
Juan Ramón Curbelo – Indios – 2008–10
Eduardo de la Peña – Tecos – 1982–83
Alfredo de los Santos – Cobras – 1986–87
Jonathan dos Santos – Querétaro – 2021–22
José Luís Esperanza – Atlas 1972–73
Rodolfo Falero – Atlas – 1998
César Falletti – Tijuana – 2019–20
Daniel Fascioli – Veracruz – 1996/1997
Álvaro Fernández – Puebla – 2008
Gabriel Fernández – Juárez – 2021–
Hugo Fernández – Puebla, Atlas – 1978–80, 1981
Leonardo Fernández – Toluca, Tigres UANL – 2020/2022–, 2020–21
Sebastián Fernández – San Luis – 2012
Silvio Fernández – Jaguares – 2003
Ángel Ferreira – Atlas – 1972–73
William Ferreira – Leones Negros – 2014
Raúl Ferro – Gallos Blancos – 2011
Mateo Figoli – Gallos Blancos, Puebla – 2006–07, 2007
Fabricio Formiliano – Necaxa – 2021–
Julio Franco – Morelia, Tampico Madero – 1983–84, 1984–85
Gonzalo Freitas – Mazatlán – 2021–22
Roberto Gadea – Tigres, Atlas – 1975–79, 1979–80
Rafael García – Morelia – 2015
Walter Gargano – Monterrey – 2015–17
Walter Gassire – Toluca, Campesinos, Atlético Español, Tampico Madero – 1974–80, 1980–81, 1981–82, 1982–83
Eduardo Gerolami – Campesinos – 1980–82
Héctor Giménez – San Luis, Necaxa, Indios – 2005, 2007–08, 2009–10
Federico Gino – San Luis – 2021
Jorge Gonçalves – Cruz Azul – 1991–93
Álvaro González – Atlas – 2015–16
Álvaro Fabián González – Pumas, Puebla – 2002–03, 2007–10
Fabián González – Santos Laguna – 1991–92
Fernando Gorriarán – Santos Laguna, Tigres – 2019–22, 2023–
Uruguay Graffigna – Pachuca, Atlético Español – 1972–73, 1973–74
Wilson Graniolatti – Santos Laguna, Gallos Blancos, Atlante – 1988–89, 1990–91, 1991–96
Pablo Granoche – Toluca, Veracruz – 2005, 2006–07
Diego Guastavino – Gallos Blancos – 2012/2014
Marcelo Guerrero – San Luis – 2005–08
Walter Guglielmone – Pachuca, Jaguares – 2004, 2005
Emanuel Gularte – Puebla – 2020–
Luis Heimen – Santos Laguna, Correcaminos – 1989–90, 1990–91
Abel Hernández – San Luis – 2022
Nelson Hernández – Potosino – 1975–76
Robert Herrera – Puebla, Pachuca – 2015–17, 2017–18
Juan Izquierdo – San Luis – 2021
Gary Kagelmacher – León – 2022
Jonathan Lacerda – Santos Laguna, Atlas, Puebla, Sinaloa, Juárez – 2010–11/2014, 2011, 2012/2013, 2015–16, 2019–20
Miguel Larrosa – Atlas, Necaxa – 1996–97, 2003
Gustavo León – América, Puebla, Campesinos, Tampico, Potosino, Ángeles – 1973–75, 1975–80, 1980–82, 1982–83, 1983–84, 1987–88
Martín Ligüera – San Luis – 2005–06
Hernán Rodrigo López – Pachuca, América – 2004, 2007–08
Nicolás López – Tigres – 2020–
Pablo López – Toluca – 2020–21
Brian Lozano – América, Santos Laguna, Atlas – 2016, 2017–20/2021–22, 2023–
Josemir Lujambio – Gallos Blancos – 2002–03
Adrián Luna – Veracruz – 2016–19
Emilio MacEachen – Necaxa – 2017
Fernando Machado – Pumas, Celaya, San Luis – 1998, 2002, 2006
Oribe Maciel – América, Curtidores – 1973–74, 1975–81
Hugo Magallanes – Querétaro – 2020
Alejandro Majewski – Monterrey, Veracruz – 1962–63, 1965–66
Francisco Majewski – Atlante, Necaxa – 1961–63, 1963–70
Walter Mantegazza – León, Tigres – 1974–77, 1977–79
Enzo Martínez – Querétaro – 2022–
Federico Martínez – León – 2022
Roberto Matosas – Toluca – 1974–76
Camilo Mayada – San Luis – 2019–21
Nelson Sebastián Maz – Indios, León – 2008, 2012–14
Leonardo Medina – Jaguares – 2006
Pedro Medina – San Luis, Tampico, Potosino – 1976–77, 1977–78, 1978–79
Pablo Míguez – Puebla – 2016–17
Gabriel Miranda – Santos Laguna, Atlante – 1993, 1995–96
Gonzalo Montes – Querétaro – 2020–21
Carlos María Morales – Toluca, Atlas, Tecos – 1995–97/1999–02, 2002–05, 2005
Claudio Morena – Tecos, Pachuca – 1992–95, 1996
Darío Muchotrigo – Tecos – 1996–97
Álvaro Navarro – Puebla – 2016–17
Joaquín Noy – Juárez – 2019
Carlos Núñez – Jaguares – 2016
Richard Núñez – Cruz Azul, Pachuca, América – 2005/2006–07, 2006, 2008
Bryan Olivera – Querétaro – 2021
Maximiliano Olivera – Juárez – 2020–
Nicolás Olivera – Necaxa, Atlas, Puebla, América – 2006, 2007, 2008–09/2010, 2011
Agustín Oliveros – Necaxa – 2021–
Mario Orta – Morelia – 1990–91
Sergio Órteman – Atlas, Gallos Blancos – 2006, 2010
Santiago Ostolaza – Cruz Azul, Gallos Blancos – 1990–92, 1992
Cristian Palacios – Puebla – 2018
Marcelo Palau – Puebla, Cruz Azul – 2010, 2011
Ignacio Pallas – Puebla – 2018–19
Julio María Palleiro – Necaxa, Toluca, América – 1951–56/1958–59, 1956–57/1958–59, 1957–58/1960–61
Juan Martín Parodi – Toros Neza – 1998–99
Juan Carlos Paz – Toluca, Tigres – 1978–85, 1987–89
Horacio Peralta – Puebla, Atlante – 2008, 2009
Hamilton Pereira – Morelia – 2014
Maximiliano Perg – Toluca, Puebla, Querétaro – 2017–18, 2019–21, 2021–22
Diego Perrone – Atlas – 2003
Víctor Piríz – San Luis, Necaxa – 2007–08, 2009
Franco Pizzichillo – Santos Laguna – 2022
Vicente Poggi – Necaxa – 2021–
Gonzalo Porras – Toluca – 2012
Gastón Puerari – Atlas – 2011
Liber Quiñones – Veracruz – 2014
Gerardo Rabadja – Puebla – 1995–98
Martín Rabuñal – Juárez – 2020
Yonatthan Rak – Tijuana – 2021–22
Kevin Ramírez – Querétaro, Puebla – 2020–21, 2022–
Ronald Ramírez – San Luis – 2004
Jonathan Ramis – Pumas – 2015
Martín Rea – Querétaro – 2020–21
Hebert Revetria – Tampico, Deportivo Neza, Tecos – 1979–81/1983–84, 1981–82, 1982–83
Diego Riolfo – Necaxa – 2016–17
Ignacio Rivero – Tijuana, Cruz Azul – 2018–20, 2020–
Octavio Rivero – Atlas, Santos Laguna – 2018, 2019–20
Pedro Rocha – Deportivo Neza – 1979–80
Braian Rodríguez – Pachuca – 2017
Brian Rodríguez – América – 2022–
Darío Rodríguez – Toluca – 1995–96
Diego Rodríguez – Tijuana – 2018–19
Felipe Rodríguez – Jaguares – 2016
Gerardo Rodríguez – Atlas – 1979–80
Guillermo Rodríguez – Atlas – 2005
Jonathan Rodríguez – Santos Laguna, Cruz Azul, América – 2016–18, 2019–21, 2022–
Jorge Rodríguez – Jaguares – 2010–13
Juan Pablo Rodríguez Conde – Indios, San Luis – 2009, 2010
Martín Rodríguez – Atlante, Irapuato, Veracruz, San Luis – 1999, 2000–01, 2002–03, 2004
Ribair Rodríguez – Santos Laguna – 2014
Sebastián Rodríguez – Veracruz – 2019
Lucas Rodríguez Trezza – Atlas – 2022–
Diego Rolán – Juárez – 2019–20/2021–22
Adrián Romero – Gallos Blancos – 2009–11
Marcelo Rotti – Tampico Madero – 1989–90
Gustavo Salgado – Atlas – 1989–92
Juan Manuel Salgueiro – Necaxa, Toluca – 2007, 2014
Juan Manuel Sanabria – San Luis – 2021–
Carlos Sánchez – Puebla, Monterrey – 2013–14, 2016–18
Vicente Sánchez – Toluca, América – 2001–07, 2010–11
Cecilio de los Santos – América, Tigres, Puebla – 1988–94, 1994–95, 1995–96
Matías Santos – Veracruz – 2018
Adrián Sarkisian – Veracruz – 2002
Roberto Scarone – América – 1943–45
Andrés Scotti – Puebla – 2000
Diego Seoane – Necaxa – 2000
Robert Siboldi – Atlas, Cruz Azul, Puebla, Tigres – 1989–92, 1993–94, 1994–95, 1995–99
Andrés Silva – América, León, San Luis – 1997/2000, 2001, 2002
Gastón Silva – Puebla – 2022–
Sergio Silva – Torreón, Unión de Curtidores, San Luis, Tampico – 1972–73, 1974–75, 1976–77, 1977–78
Hugo Silveira – Querétaro – 2020–21
Maximiliano Silvera – Juárez, Necaxa – 2022, 2023–
Nicolás Sosa – León, Querétaro – 2020–21, 2021
Sebastián Sosa – Morelia, Mazatlán, Pumas – 2017–20, 2020, 2023–
Sebastián Sosa – Querétaro – 2020
Cristian Souza – Pachuca – 2020
Pio Tabaré – Curtidores – 1975–76
Christian Tabó – Atlas, Puebla, Cruz Azul – 2015–17, 2018–21, 2022–
Sebastián Taborda – Pumas – 2003
Richard Tavares – Monterrey, Puebla, Veracruz – 1991–94, 1995–96, 1997–98
Marcelo Tejera – Tecos – 2003–04
Franco Torgnascioli – Pachuca – 2020
Jesús Trindade – Pachuca – 2022
Lorenzo Unanue – Potosino, Toros Neza, Tecos – 1980–83, 1986–87, 1988–89; 1983–84; 1987–88
Jonathan Urretaviscaya – Pachuca, Monterrey – 2015–17, 2018–19
Gonzalo Vargas – Atlas – 2008–10
Sergio Marcelo Vázquez – Necaxa, Tigres, Puebla – 1997–00, 2000–01, 2001–03
Emiliano Velázquez – Juárez – 2022–
Diego Vera – Gallos Blancos – 2012–13
Mauricio Victorino – Veracruz – 2006–07
Nicolás Vigneri – Cruz Azul, Puebla – 2008, 2009
Nicolás Vikonis – Puebla, Mazatlán – 2018–20, 2021–
Mauro Vila – Gallos Blancos – 2009–10
Federico Viñas – América – 2019–
Tabaré Viudez – Necaxa – 2010
Facundo Waller – Pumas, San Luis, Puebla – 2020–21, 2021–22, 2023–
José Zalazar – Tecos – 1986–87/1988–89
Ismael Zabaleta – Asturias – 1943–44

Venezuela 
Juan Arango – Monterrey, Pachuca, Puebla, Tijuana – 2000–01, 2002–03, 2003–04, 2014–15
Daniel Arismendi – Atlante – 2008
Fernando Aristeguieta – Morelia, Mazatlan, Puebla – 2019–20, 2020–21, 2021–
Eduard Bello – Mazatlán – 2022–
Cristian Cásseres – Atlas – 2000
Jesús Gómez – Necaxa – 2016
César González – San Luis – 2009–10
Félix Hernández – Celaya – 1998–99
Darwin Machís – Juárez – 2022–23
Giancarlo Maldonado – Atlante, Atlas – 2007–09/2010–11, 2012
Jesús Meza – Atlas – 2011–12
Jhon Murillo – San Luis – 2022–
Yohandry Orozco – Puebla – 2019
Rómulo Otero – Cruz Azul – 2021–22
Yeferson Soteldo – Tigres – 2022
José Manuel Velázquez – Veracruz – 2017
Oswaldo Vizcarrondo – América – 2012

References

External links
 Medio Tiempo: Player search
 National Football Teams: Player search
 CF América @ RSSSF.com

Mexico
 
 
Association football player non-biographical articles